= Ignorance (disambiguation) =

Ignorance is a state of being uninformed.

Ignorance may also refer to:

== Social sciences ==
- Pluralistic ignorance, a concept in social psychology
- Rational ignorance, a concept in epistemology
- Vincible ignorance, a moral or doctrinal matter in Catholic ethics
- Ignorantia juris non excusat, literally "ignorance of the law is no excuse", the legal principle that the law applies also to those who are unaware of it
- Avidyā (Hinduism), ignorance as a concept in Vedanta
- Avijja, ignorance as a concept in Buddhism

== Literature ==
- Ignorance (novel), a 2000 novel by Milan Kundera
- Ignorance, a poem in Philip Larkin's collection The Whitsun Weddings

== Music ==
- Ignorance (Sacred Reich album), 1987
- Ignorance (The Weather Station album), 2021
- "Ignorance" (song), a song by American pop punk band Paramore
- Steve Ignorant, British punk musician

== See also ==
- Ignorance Is Bliss (disambiguation)
- Ignoring (disambiguation)
