= Ignorance Is Bliss =

"Ignorance is bliss" may refer to:

- "Ignorance Is Bliss", a phrase coined by English poet Thomas Gray in his 1742 "Ode on a Distant Prospect of Eton College"
- "In knowing nothing, life is most delightful" (In nil sapiendo vita iucundissima est), a quote by Publilius Syrus

== Music ==
- Ignorance Is Bliss (Face to Face album), a 1999 album by Face to Face
- Ignorance Is Bliss (Skepta album), a 2019 album by Skepta
- "Ignorance Is Bliss" (Tiddas song), a 1996 song by Tiddas
- "Ignorance Is Bliss", a song by punk rock band Ramones, from their album Brain Drain (1989)
- "Ignorance Is Bliss", a song by San Francisco '90s rock band Jellyfish, from the compilation album Nintendo: White Knuckle Scorin' (1991)
- "Ignorance Is Bliss", a song by American rock band Living Colour, from their album Stain (1992)
- "Ignorance Is Bliss", a song by British record producer Alan Parsons, from his album The Time Machine (1999)
- "Ignorance Is Bliss", a song by hip hop artist Kendrick Lamar, from his album Overly Dedicated (2010)
- "Ignorance Is Bliss", a song by the American metalcore band Beartooth, from their album Disgusting (2014)
- "Ignorance Is Bliss", a song by hip hop artist Reks from his album REBELutionary (2012)
- "Ignorance Is Bliss", a song by American singer Alice Merton (2025)

== Other uses ==
- Ignorance Is Bliss (film), a 2017 Italian film directed by Massimiliano Bruno
- "Ignorance Is Bliss" (House), a 2009 episode of House
- Alice: Ignorance Is Bliss, a short 2014 documentary
- "Ignorance Is Bliss", a famous line said by the character Cypher from the movie The Matrix (1999); see Red pill and blue pill

== See also ==
- Ignorance (disambiguation)
- Bliss (disambiguation)
- Blissful ignorance effect
- "Ignorance is strength", a phrase used in the novel Nineteen Eighty-Four
