= Ignoring =

Ignoring is the present participle of ignore meaning: "to refuse to pay attention to; disregard".

Specific related tactics include:

- Tactical ignoring
- Silent treatment
- Shunning
- Social rejection
- Stonewalling

== See also ==
- Avoidance (disambiguation)
- Ignorance
