= Social commentary =

Act of offering one's views on people bound by culture, through rhetoric

Social commentary is the act of providing commentary on social, cultural, political, or economic issues in society. It can be expressed through various forms of communication and media, including visual artwork, photography, fiction, public speaking, music, film, television, comics, and the Internet. Examples include graffiti addressing public issues, photography documenting social conditions, literary and film works commenting on society, dystopian fiction exploring technology, surveillance and social control, rap music addressing racism and poverty, and online platforms enabling discussion and debate.

== Forms ==
This list is far from exhaustive. Examples of social commentary may be found in any form of communication. Artistic works of all mediums are often defined by what they say about society. Despite being wordless, the memorable image of the Tiananmen Square protests of 1989 may be considered one of the most profound commentaries of the power of the individual. Many recent scholars have characterised African witchcraft as critical social commentary on modernity and postcolonial capitalism and violence.

=== Visual artwork ===
Inspiration for some artists can come from issues that are present today. Deborah Silverman, Professor of History and Art History at the University of California in Los Angeles, states that the "analysis of particular visual forms expands to an interpretation of art and artists as carriers of cultural history in the crucible of modernity." This notion has been present in art throughout time. An example is Vincent van Gogh's 1885 painting The Potato Eaters, which depicts a group of poverty stricken people gathered around a table in a small room. Van Gogh created this piece to present a confronting time to the viewer. A modern example is street art, also known as graffiti. With an international reputation, artist and political activist Banksy is known to produce street art that raises societal issues such as slave labour, loss of childhood and the effects of war.

=== Photography ===
Social commentary photography's purpose is to "expose social issues on ethics, society, religious, the way of life, how people live and other similarities." Sometimes this includes the harsh reality of society such as homelessness, discrimination, war and defenceless children. "Social commentary artists try their best to create artworks in order to convey messages to the community." Due to the fact that the photos are of real life situations, the contents can be perceived to be more confronting than other visual forms of social commentary. For example, the works of photojournalist and war photographer James Nachtwey provided coverage of the Rwandan genocide (1994), the Somalia famine (1992), the Jakarta Riots (1998) and the September 11 attacks in 2001.

=== Public speaking ===
Most public speaking constitutes social commentary of some form. Many sermons will describe the ills of society and offer religious solutions. Many politicians may speak in a similar fashion – in Shakespeare's Julius Caesar one can see Mark Antony's funeral speech as a commentary. The larger audience offered by radio and television has diminished the significance of public speaking as a means of social commentary.

The United Nations General Assembly (UNGA) is one of the biggest global organisations that strive to make the Earth a better place. However, without the input of many individuals, the UNGA would not be able to achieve this. Influential public speakers such as Pope Francis, Malala Yousafzai, President Barack Obama and Queen Elizabeth II, comment on societal issues. This allows the UNGA to directly listen to the issues at hand and address them accordingly.

=== Fiction ===
Allegorical fictional works such as Animal Farm clearly contain a social commentary and one can find some degree of social commentary in almost any novel. To Kill a Mockingbird can be interpreted as a commentary on racial issues, especially given the date of its publication (1960). Another example of social commentary is Thomas More's Utopia in which he uses the Utopia to satirize the values of 16th century Britain. Social commentaries have been searched for even in fantasy novels such as The Lord of the Rings, though such connections often require much conjecture, or in modern satirical fables.

=== Non-fiction ===
Directly speaking to a topic in the social discourse in writing by defining the audience, the bounds of the topic, and the presenting facts and opinions based on the primarily author and possibly on another's perspective.

=== Radio, television and film ===
Fictional works in these mediums have a similar scope to that of their literary counterparts and documentaries to the non-fiction works described above. Television and films often use powerful images to enhance their message, for example, Michael Moore's films utilise this to great effect in promoting his political beliefs. Some examples of films include Food, Inc., The Story of Stuff featuring Annie Leonard, and Morgan Spurlock's Super Size Me. And to a lesser degree, the prominent Italian exploitation film Cannibal Holocaust uses graphic violence, shocking imagery, and underlying topics in anthropology to express Ruggero Deodato's distaste for modern society – more importantly – what it has become. West Indian calypsonians participate annually in songwriting competitions with the common use of double entendre, humour and metaphor as well as monikers to avoid legal complications (see Calypso Music). The slasher film The Texas Chain Saw Massacre also uses animal rights social commentary, in the form of the movie being a metaphor, the chainsaw victims being treated like animals in slaughterhouses and then put into fridges, tenderised, and hung on meat hooks and in an interview, Russel Simmons said: "The way that woman was screaming, 'Aaaahhh,' and she's running away—that's how every animal you eat is running for his or her life". The shockumentary Mondo Cane also provided social commentary, as in one frame, there are dogs being walked in San Francisco and in the other, in Papua New Guinea people are eating dog meat, using cultures different from Western culture to shock the viewer and make them feel uncomfortable. Mondo Cane was made to promote "being civil", and uses language in the film such as "savages".

=== Dystopian fiction ===
A lot of books and games from the Cyberpunk genre, including 2020 video game Cyberpunk 2077 use social commentary usually as a means of questioning technology (ex: "Will technology make us selfish?") or questioning unethical megacorporations, as in most Cyberpunk plots the megacorporations are antagonised and demonised and Cyberpunk also sheds light on poverty-related issues. The video game series Watch Dogs, in which the protagonists are cyber vigilantes that rebel against an all-seeing government, uses social commentary against mass surveillance. 1999 film The Matrix and 1932 book Brave New World provide commentary on the Blissful ignorance effect, where in The Matrix, the protagonist named Neo can choose the red pill, a dark truth, or the blue pill, a blissful lie to stay in the Matrix or to wake up in the real world and in Brave New World the character has a choice whether or not to take soma, a drug used by the totalitarian government to keep the people happy and docile, both inspired by Plato's Cave which some consider a metaphor for life.

Similarly, in the video game We Happy Few, the fascist government uses drugs to keep people in a state of mania, to forget a certain "incident" that occurred. Secret police are dispatched to kill people who remember the event or do not take the pills and the citizens are forced to wear masks that mold faces in permanent smiles. The main character is presented with a choice at the start of the game: to take the "happiness pill" or to abstain. If the player takes the pill, the game ends and the credits roll, whereas if the player pick the latter, they begin the game. George Orwell's dystopian novel Nineteen Eighty-Four is also written as a critique of totalitarianism.

=== Rap music ===
A lot of hip-hop associated with gangsta rap or conscious rap uses sociopolitical commentary, such as N.W.A's protest song "Fuck Tha Police" or Chamillionaire and Krayzie Bone's "Ridin", typically against black racial profiling and police brutality and music from gangsta rap artist 2Pac also speak of the poverty in inner cities and racism in the United States and 1991 2Pac song Trapped discusses an incident in which 2Pac was assaulted by a police officer and talks about police brutality in the United States. In a 1988 interview about societal perspective, rapper 2Pac said "More kids are being handed crack than being handed diplomas," and "Society is like that. They’ll let you go as far as you want, but as soon as you start asking too many questions and you’re ready to change, boom, that block will come". In the interview, he also states his opinions on government action, requesting school classes on drugs, “real” sex education, scams, religious cults, police brutality, apartheid, American racism, poverty, and food insecurity. Other subjects such as foreign languages, are written off by 2Pac, saying that he does not need to learn German, he says he can hardly pay his rent, let alone book a flight to Germany.

== Monologists ==
An early radio monologist was the American Will Rogers, with sharp and good-humored observations upon society during the 1920s and 1930s. Current American monologists include:

- Jay Leno
- Garrison Keillor
- Jon Stewart
- Stephen Colbert
- Craig Ferguson
- David Letterman
- Conan O'Brien
- Bill Maher
- Jimmy Fallon
- Lawrence O'Donnell

== Discussion shows ==
There are a number of discussion shows that do not have a call in segments, but which sometimes have discussions (beyond mere interviews) with personages of current interest. In the United States of America, some such shows include:

- Jay Leno
- David Letterman
- Oprah Winfrey
- Steve Harvey

== Talk shows (call-in) ==
In the late 20th century through the present, radio and television phone-in shows allow limited discussion and sometimes debate on such issues, although if involving politics or issues exploited for political purposes the discussion is often directed by the "moderator" toward a specific point of view, typically by terminating non-conforming phone calls.

In more balanced forums it is common that a panel of well-known social commentators or experts on aspects of a topic will respond to comments from listeners after an introductory interactive discussion directed by the moderator, with only the obstreperous or extreme caller summarily terminated.

=== Newspapers and comic books ===
What is probably the most common social commentary is that of the editorial section of newspapers, where columnists give their opinion on current affairs. The letters section of papers allows a similar platform for members of the public. Editorial cartoons, such as those in The New Yorker, perform a social commentary, often with a humorous slant.

The conventional comic section is more limited, but sometimes with social commentary, often subtle and oblique, or more bold, abrasive, and consistently pointed as in, Li'l Abner, Pogo, Doonesbury, Bloom County, and Boondocks or in pulp comics such as Howard the Duck. Many other even more explicitly provocative comics (usually with a far left of center point of view) appear in various free weekly newspapers such as the San Francisco Bay Guardian and the East Bay Express (in the San Francisco Bay Area) and the Village Voice (in New York City), and similarly in many other locals, often those with a strong university or college presence.

=== The Internet ===
The web performs a similar function to the letters section described above. It is ripe with social commentary because it allows the dissemination of ideas by anyone with a computer to a potentially enormous audience, as well as instant comment and discussion. Its international scope is particularly attractive, with language the only major barrier to communication. Discussion and debate occurs in many forums and chat rooms.

== Famous social commentators ==
- Alison Bechdel
- Adam Smith
- Bill Hicks
- Mike Davis
- Bob Dylan
- Brian Merriman
- Miguel de Cervantes
- Charlie Chaplin
- Confucius
- Charles Dickens
- Frank Zappa
- Geoffrey Chaucer
- George Carlin
- George Orwell
- Jean-Luc Godard
- John Lennon
- John Locke
- JK Rowling
- Karl Marx
- Rex Murphy
- Lenny Bruce
- Lewis Black
- Mark Twain
- Martin Luther
- Martin Luther King Jr.
- Michael Moore
- Oscar Wilde
- Plato
- Camille Paglia
- Fran Lebowitz
- Ann Coulter
- Christopher Hitchens
- Roger Waters
- Rush Limbaugh
- Socrates
- Thomas More
- Virginia Woolf
- Voltaire
- Will Rogers
- Banksy
- Ayn Rand

== See also ==
- Satire
- Social criticism

== Sources ==
- Wilson, Derek (2007). Out of the Storm: The Life and Legacy of Martin Luther. London: Hutchinson. ISBN 978-0-09-180001-7.
