= The Death of God and the Meaning of Life =

2014 book by Julian Young

- First edition
- Author: Julian Young
- Subject: meaning of life
- Published: 2003
- Publisher: Routledge
- Pages: 246 pp.
- ISBN: 9780415841139

The Death of God and the Meaning of Life is a book by Julian Young, in which the author examines the meaning of life in today's secular, post-religious scientific world.

== See also ==
- God is dead
