= Avoid =

Avoid may refer to:

- Avoid note, in jazz
- "Avoid", a song by Lil Peep, featuring Wicca Phase Springs Eternal and Døves

== See also ==
- Voidable, in law
- A Void, translation of a novel by Georges Perec
- Void (disambiguation)
- Bypass (disambiguation)
- Circumnavigation
- Avoidance (disambiguation)
