= Avoidance =

Avoidance may refer to:

- Avoidance coping, a kind of coping that is generally considered maladaptive, as it promotes an exaggerated fear response through negative reinforcement
- Avoidant personality disorder, a personality disorder recognized in the Diagnostic and Statistical Manual of Mental Disorders
- Conflict avoidance, a controversial method of dealing with conflict
- Experiential avoidance, attempts to avoid thoughts, feelings, memories, physical sensations, and other internal experiences
- Australian Aboriginal avoidance practices, relationships in traditional Aboriginal society where certain people were required to avoid others in their family or clan
- Avoidance (novel), a 2002 novel by Michael Lowenthal
- Avoidance (TV series), a 2022 British comedy-drama series
- Avoidance play, a card play technique in contract bridge designed to prevent a particular defender from winning the trick

== See also ==
- Avoid (disambiguation)
