= Agnoiology =

Study of ignorance

Agnoiology (from the Greek ἀγνοέω, meaning ignorance) is the theoretical study of the quality and conditions of ignorance, and in particular of what can truly be considered "unknowable" (as distinct from "unknown"). The term was coined by James Frederick Ferrier, in his Institutes of Metaphysic (1854), as a foil to the theory of knowledge, or epistemology.

== See also ==
- Agnotology
