= Ode on a Distant Prospect of Eton College =

Ode by Thomas Gray

"Ode on a Distant Prospect of Eton College" is an 18th-century ode by Thomas Gray. It is composed of ten 10-line stanzas that generally follow a ABABCCDEED rhyme sceme, with the B lines and final D line in iambic trimeter and the others in iambic tetrameter. In this poem, Gray coined the phrase "Ignorance is bliss". It occurs in the final stanza of the poem:

To each his suff'rings: all are men,
Condemn'd alike to groan,
The tender for another's pain;
Th' unfeeling for his own.
Yet ah! why should they know their fate?
Since sorrow never comes too late,
And happiness too swiftly flies.
Thought would destroy their paradise.
No more; where ignorance is bliss,
'Tis folly to be wise.

— Thomas Gray, Stanza 10
