= Blissful ignorance effect =

Phenomenon in consumer behavior studies

In consumer behaviour studies, the Blissful Ignorance Effect is when people who have good information about a product are not expected to be as happy with the product as people who have less information about it. This happens because the person who bought the product wants to feel like they have bought the right thing. However, if the person already knows how the product works they have a tougher time trying to justify the product to themselves if it has any problems.

This effect illustrates how consumer's goals subsequently change after they have made their purchases. People crave for precise, detailed information in their decision-making stage. However, after making a choice, priorities shift as people want to be contented with their decision. In order to achieve this, information vagueness possibly increases content and acceptance of that decision by concealing the full picture and justifying the decision made.

In an experiment to test the blissful ignorance effect, two groups were created and told information about a product. The first group was told about the manufacturer's claims and given research from an outside company, the second group was given minimal information about the product. At the end of the experiment the subjects were interviewed and the researcher found that the subjects in the second group had expected the product to perform better than the first group had.

== Background ==
The Blissful Ignorance Effect (BIE) involves two key factors: the nature of the presented information (precise vs vague) and the time of occurrence of a decision (before vs after). Individuals tend to want precise information before making a decision and vague information after the decision has been made. It is postulated that there are underlying psychological processes that may explain this.

Research suggests that there are fundamentally two goals that constitutes the full decision-making process—accuracy goals, which refer to wanting as accurate information as possible, and directional goals, which refer to heavily justifying a decision made in order to achieve a particular conclusion. The interaction between these two goals, taking into account the nature of information presented in both time conditions, explains the BIE in decision-making. Specifically, before the decision-making phase, since the individual has not committed to a choice yet, the aim is to achieve a high level of accuracy in information to influence the judgement of outcome of that decision. In contrast, after the decision-making phase is when the action has been taken, which make directional goals more pronounced. This means that the individual would want to feel good about the action taken and believe that the decision would yield positive consequences.

The ambiguity of vague information allows information to be manipulated in favour of the directional goal, which is arriving at the desired conclusion, making it easier to form justifiable reasons that support this goal. In other words, vague information allows the individual to amplify the positive aspects and downplay negative attributes of the information presented in the post decision-making phase. Hence, as the individual switches from accuracy goals to directional goals before and after a decision has been made, vague information helps to build confidence in that decision, which is supported by the BIE.

== Possible explanations for the blissful ignorance effect ==
=== Vagueness aversion ===
Findings have shown that individuals try to avoid ambiguity and prefer precise over vague information. However, concrete evidence of vagueness aversion has only been proven in pre-decision phases, before the individual commits to a choice. When projected to post-decision contexts, it is predicted that individuals would be similarly averse to vagueness. This means that the concept of vagueness aversion only accounts for the primary effect of nature of information (precise vs vague) and fails to consider the time factor (before vs after a decision is made). This is incongruent with the BIE theory which suggests that individuals would rather choose vague information in the post-decision phase, and more precise information in the pre-decision phase, which involves the time factor in addition to information nature. Therefore, vagueness aversion may not account for the BIE as time context is not fully taken into account.

=== Mind-set theory ===
A second possible explanation is the mind-set theory. This theory proposed that there are two different stages linked with various cognitive mindsets that support an individual's attainment of a goal. The deliberative stage, where the mind considers whether to pursue the goal, and the implementation stage, which takes into account the various circumstances in implementing the selected goal. Deliberative mindsets tend to have an accurate and unbiased analysis of information that aims to select for desirable and feasible goals, but only in the pre-decision phase. In this phase, the individual welcomes all aspects of the information, exercising open information processing. In contrast, the implemental mindset allows for a more biased analysis of information in the post-decision phase. This close-minded information processing means that the individual only considers information in line with their actions, disregarding all irrelevant information. As the mindset theory shows an interaction between the nature of information and time factor to which a decision is made, this proposition aligns with the BIE which purports that the type of information that an individual is willing to process is related to the occurrence of that decision. For example, the preference for precise information in pre-decision phases and likewise, vague information in post-decision phases. Hence, mind-set theory may justify the concept of BIE.

=== Cognitive dissonance ===
The third possible explanation for the BIE is using the concept of cognitive dissonance. Dissonance refers to a state where an individual simultaneously possesses two cognitions that are psychologically inconsistent, driving the individual to reduce it by changing one or more of the relevant cognitions. For example, if one holds a certain belief in contrast to his actions that prove otherwise, he would aim to reduce this dissonance by altering this belief in accordance with his actions. Therefore, it could be predicted that the post-decision phase increases dissonance through the prospect of regretting a decision made beforehand. To avoid this dissonance, individuals would aim to acquire as vague information as possible after the decision-making process in order to be contented with that decision. However, despite evidence that shows the interplay between the BIE and dissonance theory in justifying certain decisions, it does not predict the shift from accuracy to directional goals between the two time phases which is the main crux of the BIE. Therefore, the cognitive dissonance theory is perhaps unable to fully account for the explanation of the BIE.
