= Ignorance =

Lack of knowledge and understanding

Ignorance is a lack of knowledge, information and understanding. Deliberate ignorance is a culturally-induced phenomenon, the study of which is called agnotology.

The word "ignorant" is an adjective that describes a person in the state of being unaware, or even cognitive dissonance and other cognitive relation, and can describe individuals who are unaware of important information or facts. Ignorance can appear in three different types: factual ignorance (absence of knowledge of some fact), object ignorance (unacquaintance with some object), and technical ignorance (absence of knowledge of how to do something).

== Consequences ==
Ignorance can have negative effects on individuals and societies, but can also benefit them by creating within them the desire to know more. For example, ignorance within science opens the opportunity to seek knowledge and make discoveries by asking new questions. Though this can only take place if the individual possesses a curious mind.

Studies suggest that adults with an adequate education who perform enriching and challenging jobs are happier, and more in control of their environment. The confidence that adults obtain through the sense of control that education provides allows those adults to go for more leadership positions and seek for power throughout their lives.

In 1984, author Thomas Pynchon observed:

We are often unaware of the scope and structure of our ignorance. Ignorance is not just a blank space on a person's mental map. It has contours and coherence, and for all I know rules of operation as well. So as a corollary to writing about what we know, maybe we should add getting familiar with our ignorance, and the possibilities therein for ruining a good story.

Another effect of ignorance is characterized by the Dunning-Kruger effect, named after the scientists David Dunning and Justin Kruger in 1999. This theory centralizes the behavior of subjects regarding their intellectual capabilities and social behaviors. The limited information or competence of people who possess the Dunning-Kruger translates into a feeling of intellectual superiority.

== See also ==
- Agnoiology – the theoretical study of the unknown and the unknowable
- Agnotology – the study of culturally-induced ignorance or doubt
- Avidya (Hinduism), ignorance, a concept in Vedanta. Vidya is knowledge. Literally, Avidya is not knowledge.
- Avidyā (Buddhism), ignorance as a concept in Buddhism
- Dunning–Kruger effect
- Fallibilism, the philosophical principle that human beings could be wrong about their beliefs, expectations, or their understanding of the world, and yet still be justified in holding their incorrect beliefs.
- General Ignorance, the final round of the BBC quiz show QI (2003 onwards), which focuses on seemingly easy questions but whose obvious answers are wrong.
  - The Book of General Ignorance (2006), based on the BBC quiz show. The book aims to correct common misconceptions.
- Hypocrisy
- Ignorance is bliss
- Ignorance management – a knowledge management practice that addresses the concept of ignorance in organizations
- Innocence – a term sometimes used to indicate a naive lack of knowledge or understanding.
- Jahiliyyah – Islamic concept for "ignorance of divine guidance".
- Newspeak – the fictional language in the 1949 novel Nineteen Eighty-Four, written by George Orwell. A reduced language created by a totalitarian state as a tool to keep the population in a controlled state of ignorance, and Crimestop described as "protective stupidity".
- wikt:norant
- Pluralistic Ignorance – a situation in which a majority of group members privately reject a norm, but go along with it because they assume, incorrectly, that most others accept it.
- Rational ignorance – a voluntary state of ignorance that can occur when the cost of educating oneself on an issue exceeds the potential benefit that the knowledge would provide
- Sociology of scientific ignorance – the study of ignorance as something relevant.
- Willful ignorance – when a person seeks to avoid liability by intentionally keeping themselves unaware of facts, or when people intentionally turn their attention away from an ethical problem
