= Epistemic virtue =

Concept in philosophy

The epistemic virtues, as identified by virtue epistemologists, reflect their contention that belief is an ethical process, and thus susceptible to intellectual virtue or vice. Some epistemic virtues have been identified by W. Jay Wood, based on research into the medieval tradition. Epistemic virtues are sometimes also called intellectual virtues.

== Foundations of epistemology ==
The foundation for epistemic virtues is epistemology, the theory of what we know to be true according to our own perception in relation to reality. Philosophers are interested in how the mind relates to reality and the overall nature of knowledge. Epistemology battles with skepticism by trying to come up with a base from which all knowledge and science can be built up. Skepticism promotes an impasse to this because we must doubt what we know in order to know if what we know is indeed true.

== Epistemic virtues and well-being ==
Virtues in general are characteristic habits or ways of relating to the world that exhibit or promote human flourishing. Epistemic virtues are those characteristic habits that promote the acquisition of and utilization of true knowledge.

There is potential tension between these two concepts because learning the truth can sometimes make a person worse off, and so remaining ignorant can arguably be the better option.

== Overview ==
Being an epistemically virtuous person is often equated with being a critical thinker and focuses on the human agent and the kind of practices that make it possible to arrive at the best accessible approximation of the truth.

Epistemic virtues include conscientiousness as well as the following:

- attentiveness
- benevolence (principle of charity)
- creativity
- curiosity (see below)
- discernment
- epistemic humility
- epistemic responsibility
- honesty
- humility
- impartiality
- intellectual courage
- intellectual humility
- listening
- objectivity
- open-mindedness
- parsimony
- passion (rational)
- reflective awareness
- studiousness/assiduity
- scrutiny
- understanding
- warranty
- wisdom

These can be contrasted to the epistemic vices such as:

- credulity
- curiosity (see below)
- denial / wishful thinking
- diṭṭhigata upādāna / attachment to views
- dishonesty
- dogmatism (irrational)
- epistemic blindness
- folly
- gullibility
- hubris
- laziness
- obtuseness
- passion (irrational)
- prejudice
- superficiality of thought
- superstition
- willful naïveté
  - anti-intellectualism
  - apathy

Note that, in the vice context, curiosity bears the medieval connotation of attraction to unwholesome things, in contrast to the positive studious (or perhaps inquisitive).

== See also ==
- Egocentrism
- Intellectual virtue
- Virtue epistemology
