= Dunning–Kruger effect =

Cognitive bias about one's own skill

Relation between average self-perceived performance and average actual performance on a college exam. The red area shows the tendency of low performers to overestimate their abilities. Nevertheless, low performers' self-assessment is lower than that of high performers.

The Dunning–Kruger effect is a cognitive bias that describes the systematic tendency of people with low ability in a specific area to give overly positive assessments of their ability. The term may also refer to the tendency of high performers to underestimate their skills. The effect was formalized and empirically studied by the psychologists David Dunning and Justin Kruger in 1999. In popular culture, the Dunning–Kruger effect is sometimes misunderstood as claiming that people with low intelligence are generally overconfident, instead of denoting specific overconfidence of people unskilled in particular areas.

The original study by Dunning and Kruger focused on logical reasoning, grammar, and social skills. Later, the effect has been demonstrated across multiple studies in a wide range of tasks from fields such as business, politics, medicine, driving, aviation, spatial memory, examinations in school, and literacy. The effect is usually measured by comparing self-assessment with objective performance. For example, participants may take a quiz and estimate their performance afterward, and their estimates are then compared to their actual results.

A number of explanations for, and criticisms of, the Dunning–Kruger effect have been proposed. The metacognitive explanation holds that poor performers misjudge their abilities because they lack the ability to recognize the qualitative difference between their performances and the performances of others. The statistical explanation holds that the empirical effect may largely be the result of a mere statistical effect and the fact that people have a general tendency to think that they are better than average. The rational explanation holds that overly positive prior beliefs about one's skills are the source of false self-assessment. Another explanation claims that self-assessment is more difficult and error-prone for low performers because many of them have very similar skill levels.

There is also disagreement about where the effect applies and about how strong it is, as well as about the practical consequences of the effect. Inaccurate self-assessment could potentially lead low-performers to make poor decisions, such as choosing a career for which they are unfit or engaging in dangerous behavior, or could inhibit them from addressing their shortcomings to improve their competency.

== Definition ==
Not knowing the scope of your own ignorance is part of the human condition. The problem with it is we see it in other people, and we don't see it in ourselves. The first rule of the Dunning–Kruger club is you don't know you're a member of the Dunning–Kruger club.

— David Dunning

The Dunning–Kruger effect is the tendency of people with low ability in a specific area to give overly positive assessments of this ability. This is often seen as a cognitive bias, that is, a systematic tendency to engage in erroneous forms of thinking and judging. In the case of the Dunning–Kruger effect, the systematic error concerns people with low skill in a specific area trying to evaluate their competence within this area and their tendency to greatly overestimate their competence.

The Dunning–Kruger effect is usually defined specifically for the self-assessments of people with a low level of competence. But some theorists do not only restrict it to the bias of people with low skill but also use it to describe the reverse effect, the tendency of highly skilled people to underestimate their abilities relative to the abilities of others. In this case, the source of the error may not be the self-assessment of one's skills, but an overly positive assessment of the skills of others. This phenomenon can be understood as a form of the false-consensus effect, the tendency to "overestimate the extent to which other people share one's beliefs, attitudes, and behaviours".

Some researchers include a metacognitive component in their definition. In this view, the Dunning–Kruger effect is the thesis that those who are incompetent in a given area tend to be ignorant of their incompetence; they lack the metacognitive ability to become aware of their incompetence. As incompetence often includes being unable to tell the difference between competence and incompetence, it is difficult for the incompetent to recognize their incompetence. This is sometimes termed the "dual-burden" account, since low performers are affected by two burdens: they lack a skill and they are unaware of this deficiency. Other definitions focus on the tendency to overestimate one's ability and see the relation to metacognition as a possible explanation that is not part of the definition. This contrast is relevant since the metacognitive explanation is controversial. Many criticisms of the Dunning–Kruger effect target this explanation but accept the empirical findings that low performers tend to overestimate their skills.

Among laypeople, the Dunning–Kruger effect is often misunderstood as the claim that people with low intelligence are more confident in their knowledge and skills than people with high intelligence. According to psychologist Robert D. McIntosh and his colleagues, it is sometimes understood in popular culture as the claim that "stupid people are too stupid to know they are stupid". But the Dunning–Kruger effect applies not to intelligence in general but to skills in specific tasks. Nor does it claim that people lacking a given skill are as confident as high performers. Rather, low performers overestimate themselves but their confidence level is still below that of high performers.

== Measurement, analysis, and investigated tasks ==
Performance at an exam with 45 questions, measured first in relation to the peer group (top) and then in relation to the number of questions answered correctly (bottom). The diagram shows the average performance of the groups corresponding to each quartile.

The most common approach to measuring the Dunning–Kruger effect is to compare self-assessment with objective performance. The self-assessment is sometimes called subjective ability in contrast to the objective ability corresponding to the actual performance. The self-assessment may be done before or after the performance. If done afterward, the participants receive no independent clues during the performance as to how well they did. Thus, if the activity involves answering quiz questions, no feedback is given as to whether a given answer was correct.

The measurement of the subjective and the objective abilities can be in absolute or relative terms. When done in absolute terms, self-assessment and performance are measured according to objective standards, e.g. concerning how many quiz questions were answered correctly. When done in relative terms, the results are compared with a peer group. In this case, participants are asked to assess their performances in relation to the other participants, for example in the form of estimating the percentage of peers they outperformed. The Dunning–Kruger effect is present in both cases, but tends to be significantly more pronounced when done in relative terms; people are usually less accurate when assessing how well they did relative to their peer group than when simply predicting their raw score.

The main point of interest for researchers is usually the correlation between subjective and objective ability. To provide a simplified form of analysis of the measurements, objective performances are often divided into four groups. They start from the bottom quartile of low performers and proceed to the top quartile of high performers. The strongest effect is seen for the participants in the bottom quartile, who tend to see themselves as being part of the top two quartiles when measured in relative terms.

The initial study by David Dunning and Justin Kruger examined the performance and self-assessment of undergraduate students in inductive, deductive, and abductive logical reasoning; English grammar; and appreciation of humor. Across four studies, the research indicates that the participants who scored in the bottom quartile overestimated their test performance and their abilities. Their test scores placed them in the 12th percentile, but they ranked themselves in the 62nd percentile. Other studies focus on how a person's self-view causes inaccurate self-assessments. Some studies indicate that the extent of the inaccuracy depends on the type of task and can be improved by becoming a better performer.

Overall, the Dunning–Kruger effect has been studied across a wide range of tasks, in aviation, business, debating, chess, driving, literacy, medicine, politics, spatial memory, and other fields. Many studies focus on students—for example, how they assess their performance after an exam. In some cases, these studies gather and compare data from different countries. Studies are often done in laboratories; the effect has also been examined in other settings, including assessments of hunters' knowledge of firearms and large Internet surveys.

== Explanations ==
Various theorists have tried to provide models to explain the Dunning–Kruger effect's underlying causes. The original explanation by Dunning and Kruger holds that a lack of metacognitive abilities is responsible. This interpretation is not universally accepted, and many alternative explanations have been proposed. Some of them focus only on one specific factor, while others see a combination of various factors as the cause.

=== Metacognitive ===
The metacognitive explanation rests on the idea that part of acquiring a skill consists in learning to distinguish between good and bad performances of the skill. It assumes that people of low skill level are unable to properly assess their performance because they have not yet acquired the discriminatory ability to do so. This leads them to believe that they are better than they actually are because they do not see the qualitative difference between their performance and that of others. In this regard, they lack the metacognitive ability to recognize their incompetence. This model has also been called the "dual-burden account" or the "double-burden of incompetence", since the burden of regular incompetence is paired with the burden of metacognitive incompetence. The metacognitive lack may hinder some people from becoming better by hiding their flaws from them. This can then be used to explain how self-confidence is sometimes higher for unskilled people than for people with an average skill: only the latter are aware of their flaws.

Some attempts have been made to measure metacognitive abilities directly to examine this hypothesis. Some findings suggest that poor performers have reduced metacognitive sensitivity, but it is not clear that its extent is sufficient to explain the Dunning–Kruger effect. Another study concluded that unskilled people lack information but that their metacognitive processes have the same quality as those of skilled people. An indirect argument for the metacognitive model is based on the observation that training people in logical reasoning helps them make more accurate self-assessments. Many criticisms of the metacognitive model hold that it has insufficient empirical evidence and that alternative models offer a better explanation.

=== Statistical and better-than-average effect ===
Simulated data of the relation between subjective (self-assessed) and objective IQ. The upper diagram shows the individual data points and the lower one shows the averages of the different IQ groups. This simulation is based only on the statistical effect known as the regression toward the mean together with the better-than-average effect. Proponents of the statistical explanation use it to support their claim that these two factors are sufficient to explain the Dunning–Kruger effect.

A different interpretation is further removed from the psychological level and sees the Dunning–Kruger effect as mainly a statistical artifact. It is based on the idea that the statistical effect known as regression toward the mean explains the empirical findings. This effect happens when two variables are not perfectly correlated: if one picks a sample that has an extreme value for one variable, it tends to show a less extreme value for the other variable. For the Dunning–Kruger effect, the two variables are actual performance and self-assessed performance. If a person with low actual performance is selected, their self-assessed performance tends to be higher.

Most researchers acknowledge that regression toward the mean is a relevant statistical effect that must be taken into account when interpreting the empirical findings. This can be achieved by various methods. Some theorists, like Gilles Gignac and Marcin Zajenkowski, go further and argue that regression toward the mean in combination with other cognitive biases, like the better-than-average effect, can explain most of the empirical findings. This type of explanation is sometimes called "noise plus bias".

According to the better-than-average effect, people generally tend to rate their abilities, attributes, and personality traits as better than average. For example, the average IQ is 100, but people on average think their IQ is 115. The better-than-average effect differs from the Dunning–Kruger effect since it does not track how the overly positive outlook relates to skill. The Dunning–Kruger effect, on the other hand, focuses on how this type of misjudgment happens for poor performers. When the better-than-average effect is paired with regression toward the mean, it shows a similar tendency. This way, it can explain both that unskilled people greatly overestimate their competence and that the reverse effect for highly skilled people is much less pronounced. This can be shown using simulated experiments that have almost the same correlation between objective and self-assessed ability as actual experiments.

Some critics of this model have argued that it can explain the Dunning–Kruger effect only when assessing one's ability relative to one's peer group. But it may not be able to explain self-assessment relative to an objective standard. A further objection claims that seeing the Dunning–Kruger effect as a regression toward the mean is only a form of relabeling the problem and does not explain what mechanism causes the regression.

Based on statistical considerations, Nuhfer et al. arrive at the conclusion that there is no strong tendency to overly positive self-assessment and that the label "unskilled and unaware of it" applies only to few people. Science communicator Jonathan Jarry makes the case that this effect is the only one shown in the original and subsequent papers. Dunning has defended his findings, writing that purely statistical explanations often fail to consider key scholarly findings while adding that self-misjudgements are real regardless of their underlying cause.

=== Rational ===
The rational model of the Dunning–Kruger effect explains the observed regression toward the mean not as a statistical artifact but as the result of prior beliefs. If low performers expect to perform well, this can cause them to give an overly positive self-assessment. This model uses a psychological interpretation that differs from the metacognitive explanation. It holds that the error is caused by overly positive prior beliefs and not by the inability to correctly assess oneself. For example, after answering a ten-question quiz, a low performer with only four correct answers may believe they got two questions right and five questions wrong, while they are unsure about the remaining three. Because of their positive prior beliefs, they will automatically assume that they got these three remaining questions right and thereby overestimate their performance.

=== Distribution of high and low performers ===
Another model sees the way high and low performers are distributed as the source of erroneous self-assessment. It is based on the assumption that many low performers' skill levels are very similar, i.e., that "many people [are] piled up at the bottom rungs of skill level". This would make it much more difficult for them to accurately assess their skills in relation to their peers. According to this model, the reason for the increased tendency to give false self-assessments is not a lack of metacognitive ability but a more challenging situation in which this ability is applied. One criticism of this interpretation is directed against the assumption that this type of distribution of skill levels can always be used as an explanation. While it can be found in various fields where the Dunning–Kruger effect has been researched, it is not present in all of them. Another criticism holds that this model can explain the Dunning–Kruger effect only when the self-assessment is measured relative to one's peer group, but that it may fail when it is measured relative to absolute standards.

=== Lack of incentive ===
A further explanation, sometimes given by theorists with an economic background, focuses on the fact that participants in the corresponding studies lack incentive to give accurate self-assessments. In such cases, intellectual laziness or a desire to look good to the experimenter may motivate participants to give overly positive self-assessments. For this reason, some studies were conducted with additional incentives to be accurate. One study gave participants a monetary reward based on how accurate their self-assessments were. These studies failed to show any significant increase in accuracy for the incentive group in contrast to the control group.

== Practical significance ==
There are disagreements about the Dunning–Kruger effect's magnitude and practical consequences as compared to other psychological effects. Claims about its significance often focus on how it causes affected people to make decisions that have bad outcomes for them or others. For example, according to Gilles E. Gignac and Marcin Zajenkowski, it can have long-term consequences by leading poor performers into careers for which they are unfit. High performers underestimating their skills, though, may forgo viable career opportunities matching their skills in favor of less promising ones that are below their skill level. In other cases, the wrong decisions can also have short-term effects. For example, Pavel et al. hold that overconfidence can lead pilots to operate a new aircraft for which they lack adequate training or to engage in flight maneuvers that exceed their proficiency.

Emergency medicine is another area where the correct assessment of one's skills and the risks of treatment matters. According to Lisa TenEyck, the tendencies of physicians in training to be overconfident must be considered to ensure the appropriate degree of supervision and feedback. Schlösser et al. hold that the Dunning–Kruger effect can also negatively affect economic activities. This is the case, for example, when the price of a good, such as a used car, is lowered by the buyers' uncertainty about its quality. An overconfident buyer unaware of their lack of knowledge may be willing to pay a much higher price because they do not take into account all the potential flaws and risks relevant to the price.

Another implication concerns fields in which researchers rely on people's self-assessments to evaluate their skills. This is common, for example, in vocational counseling or to estimate students' and professionals' information literacy skills. According to Khalid Mahmood, the Dunning–Kruger effect indicates that such self-assessments often do not correspond to the underlying skills. It implies that they are unreliable as a method for gathering this type of data. Regardless of the field in question, the metacognitive ignorance often linked to the Dunning–Kruger effect may inhibit low performers from improving themselves. Since they are unaware of many of their flaws, they may have little motivation to address and overcome them.

Not all accounts of the Dunning–Kruger effect focus on its negative sides. Some also concentrate on its positive sides, e.g., that ignorance is sometimes bliss. In this sense, optimism can lead people to experience their situation more positively, and overconfidence may help them achieve even unrealistic goals. To distinguish the negative from the positive sides, two important phases have been suggested to be relevant for realizing a goal: preparatory planning and the execution of the plan. According to Dunning, overconfidence may be beneficial in the execution phase by increasing motivation and energy. However, it can be detrimental in the planning phase since the agent may ignore bad odds, take unnecessary risks, or fail to prepare for contingencies. For example, being overconfident may be advantageous for a general on the day of battle because of the additional inspiration passed on to his troops. But it can be disadvantageous in the weeks before by ignoring the need for reserve troops or additional protective gear.

Historical precursors of the Dunning–Kruger effect were expressed by theorists such as Charles Darwin ("Ignorance more frequently begets confidence than does knowledge") and Bertrand Russell ("in the modern world the stupid are cocksure while the intelligent are full of doubt"). In 2000, Kruger and Dunning were awarded the satirical Ig Nobel Prize in recognition of the scientific work recorded in "their modest report".

== See also ==
- List of cognitive biases
- 1995 Greater Pittsburgh bank robberies – Inspiration for the Dunning–Kruger effect
- Curse of knowledge – Cognitive bias of assuming others share your knowledge
- Easiness effect – Epistemic overconfidence instilled by pop-sci oversimplifications
- Four stages of competence – Psychological states when gaining a skill
- Hubris – Extreme pride or overconfidence
- I know that I know nothing – Famous saying by Socrates
- Illusion of explanatory depth – Form of cognitive bias
- Illusory superiority – Cognitive bias
- Impostor syndrome – Psychological pattern
- Intellectual humility – Recognition of the limit of one's knowledge
- Ne supra crepidam – Warning to avoid passing judgement beyond one's expertise
- Overconfidence effect – Personal cognitive bias
- Self-serving bias – Distortion to enhance self-esteem, or to see oneself overly favorably
