= Intellectual courage =

Intellectual courage falls under the philosophical family of intellectual virtues, which stem from a person's doxastic logic.

Broadly differentiated from physical courage, intellectual courage refers to the cognitive risks strongly tied with a person's personality traits and willpower—their quality of mind. Branches include: Intellectual humility, Intellectual responsibility, Intellectual honesty, Intellectual perseverance, Intellectual empathy, Intellectual integrity, and Intellectual fair-mindedness.

Under various definitions, intellectual courage is present in everyone, and is often dependent on its context and/or situation. Classical philosophers such as Socrates, Plato, and Aristotle have studied and observed the importance of this virtue, so as to understand and grasp the impacts of intellectual courage on the human mind.

Different interpretations of intellectual courage have developed, largely influenced by the writings of philosophers, changes in culture, and shifts in societal norms.

The opposite of achieving intellectual courage is referred to as intellectual arrogance.

== Definitions ==
Intellectual courage aligns a person's actions with their rational beliefs. On a daily basis, many emotions such as fear and desire influence decisions. The degree to which a person is able to control or give in to such emotions, determines the strength of their intellectual courage.

A concise interpretation of intellectual courage is:

Intellectual courage may be defined as having a consciousness of the need to face and fairly address ideas, beliefs or viewpoints toward which one has strong negative emotions and to which one has not given a serious hearing. Intellectual courage is connected to the recognition that ideas that society considers dangerous or absurd are sometimes rationally justified (in whole or in part). Conclusions and beliefs inculcated in people are sometimes false or misleading. To determine for oneself what makes sense, one must not passively and uncritically accept what one has learned. Intellectual courage comes into play here because there is some truth in some ideas considered dangerous and absurd, and distortion or falsity in some ideas held strongly by social groups to which we belong. People need courage to be fair-minded thinkers in these circumstances. The penalties for nonconformity can be severe.

— Richard Paul & Linda Elder

There are many other interpretations of intellectual courage.

A common interpretation is to conceptualise intellectual courage as a component in the family of courage, together with social courage, physical courage, moral courage, and philosophical courage.

Intellectual courage is a "character strength", along with other personality aspects such as self-generated curiosity and open-mindedness.

The development of intellectual courage is iterative, stemming from the ongoing influence of one's social surroundings and environment. This helps explain the varying degrees of intellectual courage present in each person.

== Manifestation ==
Virtues have been a topic of philosophy since ancient times. Aristotle examined intellectual virtues as a separate category in The Nicomachean Ethics.

Religions such as Buddhism have their own perspective on specific virtues, and what classifies as a virtue.

Courage does not always take form in its physical and common connotation, but also in its cognitive form, being an attribute that one can possess, as a "courageous thinker". Intellectual courage is also widely used to describe political situations, such as the quality of someone who maintains a reasonable position in the face of political or popular pressure. The demonstration of intellectual courage in this sense can sometimes be valued in leaders.

Intellectual courage comes into play in more ordinary circumstances as well, whenever a person needs to use unclouded reasoning to choose between alternatives for which there are competing ethical, logical, reasonable, and self-interested arguments in their favor.

A person's intellectual courage depends on their self-reliance.

== Teachings of intellectual courage ==
Intellectual courage is an underappreciated element of personal growth. Many philosophical writers have identified the need for instruction in the intellectual virtues, such as intellectual courage, as part of liberal education.

Intellectual courage encourages life-long learning. However much childhood education fails to endow students with intellectual virtues. Students can become high achievers in school by memorising and taking notes religiously, without learning how to reason well. S.N. Nordby encourages the integration of training in intellectual courage into education—"when done with parity, it can keep disciplines from becoming insular and reduce the number of echo chambers in academia."

Intellectual courage is a trait of a "disciplined mind" that also exhibits intellectual integrity, intellectual humility, intellectual sense of justice, intellectual perseverance, intellectual fair-mindedness, intellectual confidence in reason, intellectual empathy, and intellectual autonomy. A person with this collection of traits will achieve higher critical skills, higher quality of thought, and a higher order of thinking.

An opposite of intellectual courage is intellectual arrogance. It may arise from taking in "superficially absorbed content" such as that found in "shallow coverage" education. This hinders open-mindedness towards new and unconventional problems, and it also hinders the willingness to take risks in new ventures. This encourages the student to stay within the boundaries of norms and safety nets, allowing very little room for growth.

Aristotle, author of Eudemian Ethics

== History in Greek philosophy ==
Philosophers such as Aristotle, Plato, and Socrates touched upon intellectual courage by means of their discussions of the intellectual virtues.

Aristotle examined virtues such as intellectual courage in his Eudemian Ethics and Nicomachean Ethics. Aristotle defines courage as the virtue that occupies a mean between cowardice and recklessness.

Although initially discussing the physical and literal conception of courage, Aristotle does not exclude it from other possible senses. He discusses moral and intellectual virtues separately, in harmony with his assertion that deliberate human actions result from the combination of desire (which is influenced by moral virtues) with reason (which is influenced by intellectual virtues). The act of displaying intellectual courage in this sense, would be to maintain one's reasonable conclusions in the face of fear that tempts one to change one's mind. This sort of courage is costly and effortful.

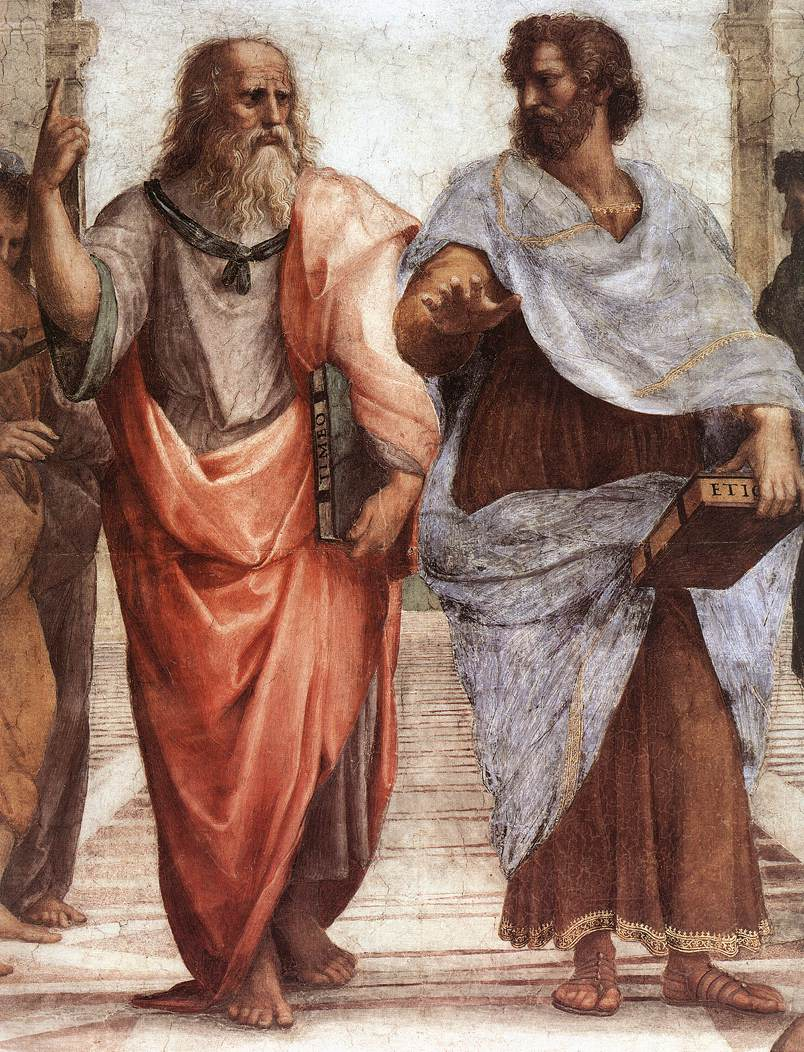
Plato and Aristotle, ancient Greek philosophers on intellectual virtues

Plato also extensively discussed the virtue of courage, including intellectual courage. Plato went as far as to "single out courage for special treatment". He compared a shortfall of intellectual courage to a "weakness of will".

Prior to Socrates, there were predominantly two conventional interpretations of courage in Ancient Greece: The first was heroic courage, with the "greatest literary representatives" being ancient heroes such as Achilles, Diomedes, and Hector. The second defined courage as "the willingness of the citizen-soldier to stand and fight in the battle line".

Courage was defined entirely in terms of physical courage early on; the introduction of intellectual courage came much later, where it was used to describe the thoughts of warriors.

== Role in mathematical creativity ==
Intellectual courage in the domain of mathematics concerns the relationship between a person's intellectual courage and their mathematical creativity.

Academic privilege is not the only factor that contributes to the minds of mathematically talented students. This is seen from the process and the emotional investment that is put into practice.

While personal traits such as curiosity, passion, and drive have been widely discussed as additional contributing factors, intellectual courage also plays a crucial role in the success of mathematicians.

Intellectual courage, in this perspective, has four key drivers: persistence, self-confidence, insight, and motivation.

If these drivers co-exist, intellectual courage comes into play when an individual experiences a situation that couples risk and the uncertainty of a finish line. It means to take the risk of committing significant time and resource to something that may lead to nothing.

Being aware that this investment of effort may or may not pay off, and accepting that their efforts may go unrewarded, is what mathematicians describe as taking a leap with intellectual courage.
