= Epistemic humility =

Philosophical view of scientific observation

In the philosophy of science, epistemic humility is a posture of scientific observation rooted in the recognition that (a) knowledge of the world is always interpreted, structured, and filtered by the observer, and that, as such, (b) scientific pronouncements must be built on the recognition of observation's inability to grasp the world in itself. The concept is frequently attributed to the traditions of German idealism, particularly the work of Immanuel Kant, and to British empiricism, including the writing of David Hume. Other histories of the concept trace its origin to the humility theory of wisdom attributed to Socrates in Plato's Apology. James Van Cleve describes the Kantian version of epistemic humility—i.e. that we have no knowledge of things in their "nonrelational respects or ‘in themselves'"—as a form of causal structuralism. More recently, the term has appeared in scholarship in postcolonial theory and critical theory to describe a subject-position of openness to other ways of 'knowing' beyond epistemologies that derive from the Western tradition.

== Epistemic humility as a virtue ==
=== Epistemic humility and epistemic confidence ===
According to philosopher of science Ian James Kidd, epistemic humility is a virtue that emerges from the recognition of the fragility of epistemic confidence—that is, of "the confidence invested in activities aimed at the acquisition, assessment, and application of knowledge and other epistemic goods". For Kidd, any given truth claim rests on three types of confidence conditions: cognitive conditions, or specialized knowledge in a particular knowledge domain; practical conditions, or the ability to perform certain actions required to ascertain the claim; and material conditions, or access to particular objects about which truth claims are made. Moreover, these confidence conditions operate on three levels: agential confidence (conditions for particular epistemic agents); collective confidence (conditions for groups of epistemic agents structured by disciplines, institutions, and other forms of community); and deep confidence (conditions for confidence rooted in 'deep' commitments, such as theories, theologies, or shared cultural inheritances). Kidd argues that the virtue of epistemic humility registers an appreciation for the complexity and contingency of this web of conditions required to make assertions, particularly scientific ones. In Kidd's words,

Colleagues can let us down, shared epistemic practices can be abused, and institutions can be corrupted. The virtue of epistemic humility therefore builds in, at the ground level, an acute sense of the fact that epistemic confidence is conditional, complex, contingent, and therefore fragile.

For Kidd, while recognition of the fragility of epistemic confidence is a necessary component of epistemic humility, it is not sufficient. Epistemic humility emerges as a virtue only when such recognition is combined with changes to one's epistemic comportment. That is to say, epistemic humility requires a "disposition to regulate one’s epistemic conduct in the light of one’s changing fulfilment of relevant confidence conditions. A humble enquirer is disposed, that is, to actively regulate their epistemic conduct, their personal ways of engaging in epistemic activities." Epistemic humility thus entails both recognition of the fragility of epistemic confidence and regulation of one's epistemic conduct accordingly. Kidd offers several examples of how 'humble enquirers' achieve this self-regulation. He writes that

Perhaps they take care to carefully qualify claims to reflect the degree of confidence they can justify, sharing Montaigne's fondness for words and phrases that "soften and moderate" the typical "rashness" of our speech – "perhaps", "I think", "as far as I know" (1991, 1165). Perhaps they regulate their ambitions by ensuring the epistemic projects they commit to are ones whose constituent conditions they could fulfil—aspiring to contribute to, rather than define, an area of study. Taken together, a humble enquirer is disposed to actively regulate their epistemic conduct by recognising and appropriately responding to the complex economy of confidence upon which their activities and projects rely.

Kidd's account of epistemic humility is domain-neutral and applies equally to scientific and humanistic forms of epistemic inquiry that are both simple and complex.

=== Socratic humility theory of wisdom ===
Philosopher Sharon Ryan ascribes the notion of epistemic humility to Socrates' conception of wisdom in Plato's Apology. In the Apology, Chaerephon asks the Oracle at Delphi whether anyone is wiser than Socrates, to which the Oracle replies in the negative. Socrates expresses surprise at the Oracle's response because he claims to know nothing. He thus conducts a series of inquiries with those whom he presumes to be wiser than himself—politicians, poets, and craftsmen–to determine the nature of wisdom. After interviewing the politicians on various topics, Socrates finds that although they claim to know a lot, in fact they know very little. Similarly, although the poets produce verse seemingly rooted in wisdom, they are unable to explain their work. Socrates therefore determines that their poetry derives from divine inspiration rather than from wisdom that they directly possess. Finally, Socrates finds that craftsmen possess some knowledge, which is more than Socrates believes that he possesses. But since he believes the Oracle must be telling the truth, Socrates concludes that the common flaw shared by all three groups is that they all assert that they know things that they do not, in fact, know. Because Socrates does not have this flaw, he concludes that wisdom consists of claiming not to know what one does not know. According to Ryan's reading of this anecdote, "[w]isdom is had by those who lack the flaw of thinking they know things that they don't know. Socrates is the only one who lacks this crucial flaw."

Ryan claims that this dictum has generally been understood to generate four 'humility principles' about the necessary and sufficient conditions for epistemic humility, depending on one's interpretation of the text. She formulates the first two humility principles as follows:

(HP1) S is wise iff S believes s/he is not wise.

(HP2) S is wise iff S believes that S does not know anything.

Ryan rejects (HP1) and (HP2) as plausible interpretations of the parable because she believes that they do not offer sufficient conditions of wisdom. She writes: "I take myself, and most people I've known, to be clear counterexamples to (HP1). I believe I am not wise and I am right about that. I am not wise. Neither are most people I have known." Ryan elaborates that Socrates himself should be understood as a counterexample to (HP1) in Apology insofar as he recognizes himself to be wise after having solved the puzzle of why the politicians, poets, and craftsmen are not wise—and nonetheless remains wise. Accordingly, she presents a third humility principle for consideration:

(HP3) S is wise iff S believes that S knows p at t iff S knows p at t.

Ryan finds (HP3) more plausible than (HP1) or (HP2) because it shifts the constitutive element of wisdom from the mere presence/absence of first-order knowledge to the reasons that one has to support one's first-order knowledge. She finds this inclusion of a "doxastic attitude" as a key feature of wisdom to be consistent with Socrates' discoveries. Nonetheless, Ryan ultimately rejects (HP3) as well on the basis that it does not provide both necessary and sufficient conditions for wisdom. She writes that it is "possible for a person to have an incredibly well justified belief that is false. If a wise person had an incredibly well justified belief in p, she would be totally justified in believing that she knows p even if p was false. Thus, she would be totally justified in believing p even though she did not know p." Ryan believes that such a person wise could not plausibly be understood as wise within the context of the text. She thus offers a revision of (HP3) as follows:

(HP4) S is wise iff S believes that S knows p at t iff S is justified in believing p at t.

According to Ryan, (HP4) suggests that wisdom does not require a correspondence between what one believes one knows and what one actually knows. Instead, it requires only that one believes that one knows something only when that belief is justified. Still, for Ryan, (HP4) fails because it does not capture sufficient conditions for wisdom. She argues that (a) one could fail to have enough justified beliefs to be wise, and that (b) that would could have an abundance of justified beliefs but fail to act of them. Ryan thus does not find any of these four humility principles defensible as interpretations of the text. Rather, her reconstruction of the text results in the following alternative conception of epistemic humility:

(Ryan's version) S is wise iff (i) S is a free agent, (ii) S knows how to live well, (iii) S lives well, and (iv) S's living well is caused by S's knowledge about how to live well.

Ryan explains her interpretation of Socratic epistemic humility as follows:

Only a free agent could have wisdom. A wise person knows how to live well under a wide variety of circumstances. In addition, a wise person succeeds at living as best as she can given the circumstances she is in. A wise person's success at living is caused, in part, by her knowledge about how to live well."l

== Kantian humility ==
In her book Kantian Humility (1998), philosopher Rae Langton posits that Immanuel Kant's argument in Critique of Pure Reason that we can never have knowledge of things-in-themselves—that is, knowledge of mind-independent objects—should be understood as a doctrine of epistemic humility. As Langton notes, this doctrine "is not idealism, but a kind of epistemic humility. There are inevitable constraints on what we can know, inevitable limits on what we can become acquainted with." Following P. F. Strawson's The Bounds of Sense (1966), Langton argues that epistemic humility in Kant's thought emerges as the consequence of the fact of human receptivity and sensibility, i.e. that we are "affected by things of which we come to have knowledge" via the senses. Langton suggests, however, that to get from receptivity to humility, Kant requires an intermediary argument–namely, that an object's appearance is irreducible to its intrinsic properties. James van Cleve explains Langton's basic argument as follows:

Receptivity: Human knowledge depends on sensibility, and sensibility is receptive: we can have knowledge of an object only in so far as it affects us.

Irreducibility: The relations and relational properties of substances are not reducible to the intrinsic properties of substances. Therefore,

Humility: We have no knowledge of the intrinsic properties of substances.

According to van Cleve, Langton's irreducibility premise contains three components: first, that the relational properties of objects have causal power, and that by 'sensing' them, we enter into 'causal relations' with them; second, that establishing causal relations with one set of an object's properties does not necessitate establishing such relations with another set of that object's properties; and third, that necessitation in this context should be understood as logical or metaphysical necessity (as opposed to nomological or physical necessity). With these clarifications, van Cleve offers a more robust version of Langton's claim as follows:

Receptivity: We have knowledge only of those properties of things in virtue of which they enter into causal relations with us.

Irreducibility: The causal relations between things are not necessitated by their intrinsic properties. Therefore,

Humility: We have no knowledge of the intrinsic properties of things.

For van Cleve, clarifying Langton's reconstruction of Kant's argument as a syllogism in this way reveals that the argument is not valid without an additional premise. In other words, van Cleve posits that one could accept (a) that we achieve knowledge of objects only because of certain properties of objects are received by our sense organs (receptivity premise), (b) that we cannot ascertain that such relational properties are direct functions of intrinsic properties of objects (irreducibility premise), and yet conclude, (c) that we can have knowledge of some intrinsic properties of things (violation of humility conclusion). As an example, van Cleve points to philosopher Thomas Reid's discussion the primary qualities of certain objects. He argues that "[w]hen we know, as we sometimes do, that one object is round and another square, we thereby know something about how they are in themselves and not just about their relations." As such, van Cleve proposes an additional premise to complete Langton's interpretation of Kant's argument:

Necessitation: A causal relation holds between two things in virtue of certain of their properties only if necessarily, any two things with those properties are causally related.

Adding this additional premise onto Langton's argument as a whole, van Cleve believes to have reconstructed a sound and valid version of Kant's argument for epistemic humility in Critique of Pure Reason: "In brief, there is no knowledge without causation, no causation without necessitation, no necessitation by intrinsic properties, and therefore no knowledge of intrinsic properties."

== Critical theory ==
=== Human sexuality theory ===
In Heterosyncracies: Female Sexuality When Normal Wasn't (2005), English scholar Karma Lochrie argues for a measure of epistemological humility to "correct the tendencies of medieval scholars to assume heteronormativity of the past based on the presumption of widespread agreement about what heterosexuality means in the present". In this instance, Lochrie uses the concept of epistemological humility as a corrective for anachronism in historico-theoretical scholarship on gender and sexuality. Lochrie uses the term interchangeably with "hermeneutic humility", which they define as "a hermeneutic of epistemological uncertainty". In the context of queer history, Lochrie elaborates that this entails a twofold commitment to (a) avoid taking for granted the meaning of heterosexuality in the present, and, by extension, (b) avoid assuming a priori heteronormativity as a fundamental organizing principle of the past.

Lochrie attributes her use of the concept of epistemological humility as a methodological orientation in queer history to English scholar and LGBTQ activist Jack Halberstam's notion of "perverse presentism". Citing Halberstram, Lochrie summarizes the method as the "application of what we do not know in the present to what we cannot know about the past". As an example, Lochrie discusses the 1998 Clinton-Lewinsky scandal, during which former United States president Bill Clinton argued that 'sex' only refers to heterosexual penile-vaginal intercourse, prompting a debate about what 'having sex' entails—i.e. whether it includes other acts. Lochrie writes that "[h]eterosexuality was—briefly during the impeachment hearings—a matter of debate. Under public scrutiny heterosexuality turned out to be less 'as we know it' then it was 'up for grabs'." For Lochrie, histories that focus on such moments enable us to interrogate the underlying instability of certain analytic categories that we otherwise deem stable in the present, such as heterosexuality, desire, sex, and eroticism; and this, in turn, better positions the scholar to avoid uncritically deploying presentist theoretical categories, such as heteronormativity, as stable analytics of the experiences and practices of the past. In the case of the scandal, Bill Clinton's "appeal to heteronormative classification of sexual acts exposed the massive disconnection between the idea of heterosexuality and its practice in understanding the world".

=== Frankfurt School critical theory and postcolonial theory ===
In The End of Progress: Decolonizing the Normative Foundations of Critical Theory (2016), critical theorist Amy Allen develops a concept of epistemic humility rooted in postcolonial theory, Frankfurt School critical theory, and French poststructuralism. In particular, she cites the concept in relation to the works of Theodor W. Adorno and Michel Foucault, and positions the concept as a critique of the work of Jürgen Habermas, Rainer Forst, and Axel Honneth. While she cites the concept of epistemic humility directly throughout the book, her own theoretization of the concept integrates it into what she calls "metanormative contextualism", defined as humility toward one's own second-order normative commitments (i.e. frameworks and procedures through which we justify our beliefs about what 'should be' the case, rather than the beliefs themselves). She argues that this second-order humility toward one's normative commitments can be combined with first-order universalism (i.e. a commitment to the universal applicability of our normative beliefs). In other words, metanormative contextualism presumes epistemic humility insofar as it prescribes that although we can have strong normative convictions, we must forego certainty that those convictions have justifications that are universal in scope.

==== Critics ====
Historian Martin Jay criticizes Allen's concept of 'metanormative contextualism' on two grounds. First, he argues that although Allen's framework is in part a postcolonial critique of European epistemologies, she fails to adequately draw "directly on voices from outside Europe", instead relying on the theories of Theodor W. Adorno and Michel Foucault. Second, he claims that Allen upholds an overly idealized version of the 'others' to whom we owe humility. He writes:

Rather than an historically concrete community that can be granted the status of a distinct form of life with its own immanent norms, it is little more than an empty placeholder for whatever candidate postcolonial theory posits as the victim of European imperialism. Nowhere are the dilemmas of responding to actually existing postcolonial cultures confronted, cultures that, for all their virtues, may have behaved at times in ways that make abstention from condemning them morally impossible. Does it really help to 'hear that which one doesn’t already understand' in the case, say, of Rwanda or ISIS or Boko Haram or the Duarte [sic] regime in the Philippines?

== See also ==
- Epistemic virtue
- Intellectual humility
