= Gignac =

Gignac may refer to:

== Places ==
- Gignac, Hérault
- Gignac, Lot
- Gignac, Vaucluse
- Gignac-la-Nerthe, in the Bouches-du-Rhône département

== People ==
- André-Pierre Gignac (born 1985), French football striker playing for Tigres
- Anthony Gignac (born 1970), incarcerated Columbian-American con-artist and fraudster
- Brandon Gignac (born 1997), Canadian ice hockey player
- Clément Gignac (born 1955), Canadian politician in the province of Quebec
- Fernand Gignac (1934–2006), French Canadian singer and actor
- Gilles Gignac, Australian psychologist
- Justin Gignac (born 1981), American artist
- Marie Gignac, Canadian actress
- Hudson Gignac (born 2013), Canadian ice hockey player
