= I'm entitled to my opinion =

Informal fallacy

"I'm entitled to my opinion" (or "I have a right to my opinion") is an informal fallacy in which someone dismisses arguments against their position by asserting that they have a right to hold their own particular viewpoint. The statement exemplifies a red herring or thought-terminating cliché. The fallacy is sometimes presented as "let's agree to disagree". Whether one has a particular entitlement or right is irrelevant to whether one's assertion is true or false. Where an objection to a belief is made, the assertion of the right to an opinion side-steps the usual steps of discourse of either asserting a justification of that belief, or an argument against the validity of the objection. Such an assertion, however, can also be an assertion of one's own freedom from, or a refusal to participate in, the rules of argumentation and logic at hand.

Philosopher Patrick Stokes has described the expression as problematic because it is often used to defend factually indefensible positions or to imply "an equal right to be heard on a matter in which only one of the two parties has the relevant expertise". Further elaborating on Stokes' argument, philosopher David Godden argued that the claim that one is entitled to a view gives rise to certain obligations, such as the obligation to provide reasons for the view and to submit those reasons to contestation; Godden called these the principles of rational entitlement and rational responsibility, and he developed a classroom exercise for teaching these principles.

Philosopher José Ortega y Gasset wrote in his 1930 book The Revolt of the Masses:

The Fascist and Syndicalist species were characterized by the first appearance of a type of man who "did not care to give reasons or even to be right", but who was simply resolved to impose his opinions. That was the novelty: the right not to be right, not to be reasonable: "the reason of unreason."

== See also ==
- Aumann's agreement theorem
- Begging the question – Logic founded on unproven premises
- Diṭṭhigata upādāna – Attachment to views in Buddhism
- Ethics of belief
- Freedom of speech § As a negative right
- Freedom of speech § Limitations
- Intellectual responsibility – Reflectiveness about truth of beliefs
- Pragma-dialectics § Rules for critical discussion
- Relativist fallacy
