= A Luxury of the Understanding =

2013 book by Allan Hazlett

A Luxury of the Understanding: On the Value of True Belief
- Author: Allan Hazlett
- Language: English
- Subject: ethics of belief
- Publisher: Oxford University Press
- Publication date: 2013
- Media type: Print (hardcover)
- Pages: 302
- ISBN: 9780191761164

A Luxury of the Understanding: On the Value of True Belief is a 2013 book by Allan Hazlett in which the author offers an analysis of the problem of the value of belief.

== Reception ==
The book was reviewed in Mind, The Philosophical Review and Dialogue: Canadian Philosophical Review.
