= Allan Hazlett =

American philosopher

- Awards: NSF Grant, Templeton Award

Education
- Education: Brown University (PhD)
- Thesis: Grice's Razor and Moore's Gambit (2006)
- Doctoral advisor: Ernest Sosa

Philosophical work
- Era: 21st-century philosophy
- Region: Western philosophy
- Institutions: Washington University in St. Louis
- Main interests: epistemology, moral psychology, metaethics, aesthetics
- Website: sites.google.com/site/allanhazlett/

Allan Hazlett is an American philosopher and Associate Professor of Philosophy at Washington University in St. Louis. He is known for his works on skepticism and ethics of belief.

== Books ==
- A Luxury of the Understanding: On the Value of True Belief, Oxford University Press, 2013
- A Critical Introduction to Skepticism, Bloomsbury Publishing, 2014
- The Epistemology of Desire and the Problem of Nihilism, Oxford University Press, forthcoming
