= The Hard Easy =

The Hard Easy either refers to:

- "The Hard Easy" (Adventure Time), an episode of an animated television series
- The Hard Easy (film), an independent film directed by released in 2006, directed by Ari Ryan

== See also ==
- The hard–easy effect, a cognitive bias
- The Hard and the Easy (2005 album)
- Harder Than Easy (2009 album)
