= Virtue aesthetics =

Approach to aesthetics

Virtue aesthetics is treating aesthetics similarly to the frameworks of virtue ethics and virtue epistemology.
