= Ernest Sosa =

American philosopher

- Born: June 17, 1940 (age 86); Cárdenas, Cuba

Education
- Education: University of Miami; University of Pittsburgh
- Thesis: Directives: A Logico-Philosophical Inquiry (1964)
- Doctoral advisor: Nicholas Rescher

Philosophical work
- Era: Contemporary philosophy
- Region: Western philosophy
- School: Analytic
- Institutions: Brown University; Rutgers University
- Doctoral students: Brie Gertler; John Greco; Jennifer Lackey; Allan Hazlett
- Main interests: Metaphysics · Epistemology · Philosophy of mind
- Notable ideas: Virtue epistemology

Ernest Sosa (/ˈsoʊsə/; Spanish: [ˈsosa]; born June 17, 1940) is an American philosopher primarily interested in epistemology. Following a lengthy tenure at Brown University, since 2007 he has been Board of Governors Professor of Philosophy at Rutgers University.

== Education and career ==
Born in Cárdenas, Cuba, on June 17, 1940, Sosa earned his BA and MA from the University of Miami and his PhD from the University of Pittsburgh in 1964. His dissertation was supervised by Nicholas Rescher.

He joined the Rutgers faculty in 2007, having taught at Brown University since 1964. While full-time at Brown, he was also a distinguished visiting professor at Rutgers every spring from 1998 to 2006. Sosa has been described as "one of the most important epistemologists of the last half-century."

Sosa is a past president of the American Philosophical Association and a Fellow of the American Academy of Arts & Sciences. He edits the philosophical journals Noûs and Philosophy and Phenomenological Research. In 2005 he delivered the John Locke Lectures at Oxford, which formed the basis of his 2007 book.

Sosa received the 2010 Nicholas Rescher Prize for contributions to systematic philosophy, conferred by the University of Pittsburgh biennially. His son, David Sosa, is a professor and chair of the philosophy department at the University of Texas, Austin, and also specializes in epistemology.

== Philosophical work ==
In addition to epistemology, Sosa has also written on metaphysics, modern philosophy and philosophy of mind. In his books Knowledge in Perspective (1991) and A Virtue Epistemology (2007), he defends a form of virtue epistemology called "virtue perspectivism", which distinguishes animal knowledge from reflective knowledge.

=== Virtue epistemology ===
"Contemporary virtue epistemology, conceived as such and as a distinctive movement within epistemology, began with Ernest Sosa’s work in the early 1980s." Virtue epistemology is characterized by two features: against W. V. O. Quine, it views "epistemology as a normative discipline" and "intellectual agents and communities as the primary focus of epistemic evaluation, with a focus on the intellectual virtues and vices embodied in and expressed by these agents and communities."

=== Metaphysics (composition) ===
Absolutism and Its "explosion"
In "Existential Relativity," Sosa considers theories of composition. He calls ordinary theories of composition absolutism, which has objects as existing absolutely when compositional conditions are fulfilled in the object. Objects exist when certain stuff is arranged in a certain way. Absolutism leads to what Sosa calls an "explosion" of entities, in that an indeterminate number overlap at a location and any change destroys and creates an indeterminate number of others.

Sosa provides an illustration to motivate this problem. A snowball is made of a piece of snow in a "round" (spherical) shape and follows certain persistence conditions. Sosa introduces the concept of a "snowdiscall". A snowdiscall is "constituted by a piece of snow as matter and as form any shape between round [spherical] and being disc-shaped." On this definition, a snowball is also a snowdiscall, but a snowdiscall is not necessarily a snowball. So there are two distinct objects that overlap. But just as there is a snowdiscall, there can be an indeterminate number of other objects: objects between round and 50% disc-shaped, objects between round and 30% disc-shaped, etc. These are distinct, existing objects and not just arbitrary descriptions. What seems arbitrary in absolutism is that one object (the snowball) has more claim to existence than the others.

Existential relativism: As a potential solution, Sosa advances existential relativism. The central claim is that objects do not exist objectively as if some "[c]onstituted, supervenient entities [. . .] objectively supervene[d] on their requisite constitutive matters and forms." On existential relativism, composition is relative to a conceptual scheme. Conceptual schemes are collections of ideas of how the world exists and interacts. They can differ based on language, culture, personal utility, perspective, etc. A person's conceptual scheme helps select the things in the external world that resemble these ideas and then confers existence on them. Since conceptual schemes differ, different persons may recognize different objects. A conceptual scheme is chosen based on how useful it is to the person in understanding the world.

Sosa's working definition of existential relativism: "that what exists relative to our present scheme O is what it recognizes directly, what it recognizes indirectly through its predecessors or successors, and what it would recognize if we had developed appropriately or were to do so now, and had been or were to be appropriately situated." This definition allows for objects to exist if a conceptual scheme recognizes them, recognizes something that entails another object's existence, or would have recognized them if people had different capacities or spatiotemporal locations.

Sosa's anticipated objections:

- Objection 1: Would composition occur in a world without persons?
- Objection 2: Aren't "snowdiscalls" simply an arbitrary, superficial classification of an object (e.g. any cat or dog could be a "caog" without ontological problems)?
- Objection 3: Is existential relativism redundant if things exist externally in a certain way and are just recognized by a conceptual scheme? Is existential relativism just absolutism with an emphasis on human perception of the world?
- Objection 4: Is existential relativity a linguistic theory (concerned with how to describe the world as indexed to a person) and not an ontological theory? How are disagreements between opposing conceptual schemes settled?
- Objection 5: Could atoms (or other fundamental particles) exist simpliciter while other objects (e.g. hammers, cats, snowballs) exist relative to conceptual schemes?

== Bibliography ==
- Knowledge in Perspective (Cambridge University Press, 1991)
- Epistemic Justification (Blackwell Publishers, 2003), with L. BonJour
- Ernest Sosa and his Critics, ed by J. Greco (Blackwell, 2004)
- A Virtue Epistemology (Oxford University Press, 2007)
- Reflective Knowledge (Oxford University Press, 2009)
- Knowing Full Well (Princeton University Press, 2011)
- Virtuous Thoughts: The Philosophy of Ernest Sosa, ed by J. Turri (Springer 2013)
- Judgment and Agency (Oxford University Press, 2015)
- Epistemology (Princeton University Press, 2017)
- Epistemic Explanations: A Theory of Telic Normativity, and What it Explains" (Oxford University Press, 2021).

== See also ==
- American philosophy
- List of American philosophers
