= Easiness effect =

Epistemic overconfidence instilled by pop-sci oversimplifications

The easiness effect is the claim that as a result of science popularization laypeople develop an overconfident scientific understanding. This results in science-related decision-making that reflects a misunderstanding of popular science rather than the judgment of professional scientists.

== Context ==
Rainer Bromme and Susan Goldman, writing in the Educational Psychologist describe the context, stating: "Challenges to understanding science include determining the relevance of information, the tentativeness of scientific truth, distinguishing between scientific and nonscientific issues, and determining what is true and what is false."

Scotty Hendricks, a contributing writer to BigThink.com, notes that popular science writers might have to start considering the effect that their work has on the general public.

== Evidence ==
Scharrer and her co-authors studied the claimed effect by inviting laypeople to read popular science articles or articles with more scientific detail, publishing their results in Public Understanding of Science. The subjects were then interviewed to judge their scientific opinions and confidence in those opinions, in relation to the material that they had read. Scharrer's team inferred that there was a statistically significant effect of scientific overconfidence and willingness to override expert opinion.

In some of their experiments, Scharrer's team attempted to counteract the easiness effect by explicitly warning subjects of the complexity and controversiality of the scientific material presented. They found that the easiness effect disappeared partially but not completely. The researchers suggest that it has to do mostly with writing style. Popular articles condense the science and speak with certainty whereas an academic paper speaks mostly in terms of probability. Hence reading mostly popularizations leads to overconfidence in the results.

== Countermeasures ==
Scharrer and her co-authors recommended "explicitly highlighting topic complexity and controversiality" in order to reduce the easiness effect, and additionally recommended "a need for further educating the public on the division of cognitive labor and its implications for making judgments" and adding to formal science education the notion that "making reliable judgments often requires deference to scientific experts".

== Commentary ==
Mark Carnall of The Guardian said that the expanded access that laypeople have to simplified explanations of scientific facts may be the cause of their rising distrust in experts. The partial understanding they get from the "easy-to-digest science stories" from the media and bad science communication would give them confidence to reject the actual claims that scientists make. He expresses the concern that "alternative facts" exploit this effect to confuse what scientific facts really are and highlights the importance of critical thinking skills to counter this phenomenon.

== See also ==
- Dumbing down
- Pseudoscience
- Dunning-Kruger effect
