= John Greco (philosopher) =

American philosopher (born 1961)

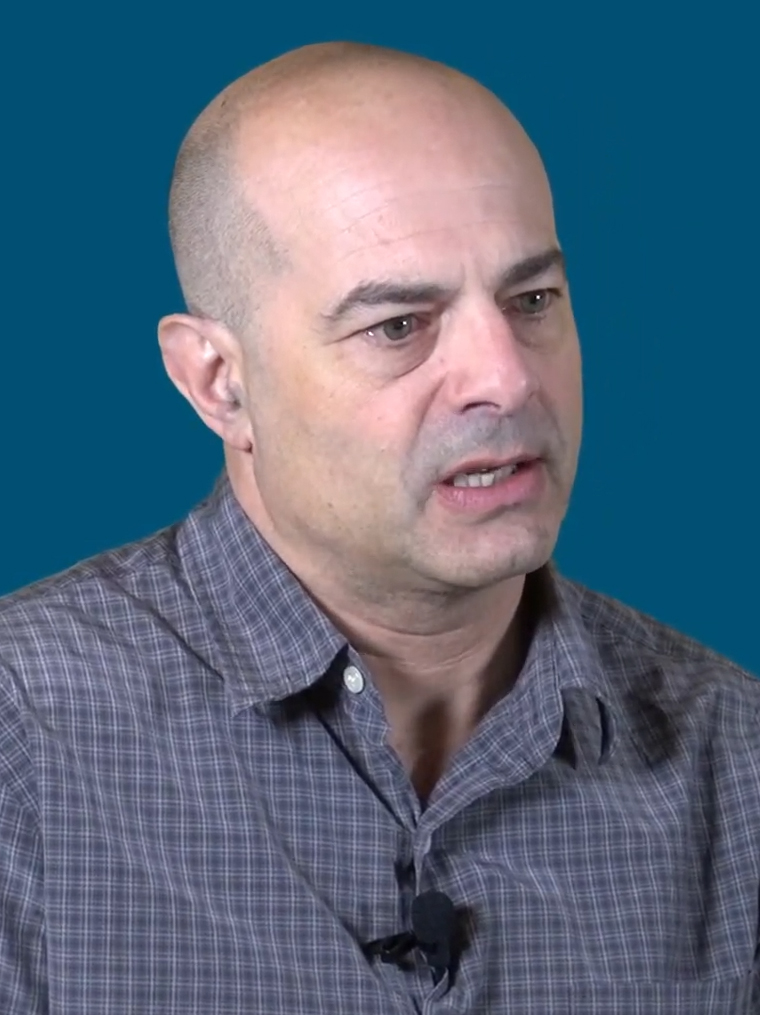
- Born: April 24, 1961 (age 65)

Academic background
- Education: Georgetown University; Brown University
- Doctoral advisor: Ernest Sosa

John Greco (born April 24, 1961) is the Robert L. McDevitt and Catherine H. McDevitt Professor of Philosophy at Georgetown University. Before coming to Georgetown, Greco taught at Saint Louis University.

Greco received his A.B. from Georgetown University in 1983 and completed his Ph.D. at Brown University in 1989 under Ernest Sosa. His research interests are in epistemology and metaphysics and he has published widely on virtue epistemology, epistemic normativity, skepticism, and Thomas Reid. From 2013 until 2020, he was the Editor of American Philosophical Quarterly. For 2013–15, together with Eleonore Stump, he held a $3.3 million grant from the John Templeton Foundation for a project on intellectual humility.

Publications

- The Transmission of Knowledge
- Achieving Knowledge: A Virtue-theoretic Account of Epistemic Normativity
- Putting Skeptics in Their Place: The Nature of Skeptical Arguments and Their Role in Philosophical Inquiry
