= A Critical Introduction to Skepticism =

2014 book by Allan Hazlett

- Author: Allan Hazlett
- Language: English
- Subject: skepticism
- Publisher: Bloomsbury Publishing
- Publication date: 2014
- ISBN: 9781441154897

A Critical Introduction to Skepticism is a 2014 book by Allan Hazlett in which the author offers an introduction to skepticism.

== Reception ==
The book was reviewed in Teaching Philosophy and Australasian Journal of Philosophy.
