= Hard–easy effect =

Cognitive bias relating to mis-estimating success based on perceived difficulty

The hard–easy effect is a cognitive bias that manifests itself as a tendency to overestimate the probability of one's success at a task perceived as hard, and to underestimate the likelihood of one's success at a task perceived as easy. The hard-easy effect takes place, for example, when individuals exhibit a degree of underconfidence in answering relatively easy questions and a degree of overconfidence in answering relatively difficult questions. "Hard tasks tend to produce overconfidence but worse-than-average perceptions," reported Katherine A. Burson, Richard P. Larrick, and Jack B. Soll in a 2005 study, "whereas easy tasks tend to produce underconfidence and better-than-average effects."

The hard-easy effect falls under the umbrella of "social comparison theory", which was originally formulated by Leon Festinger in 1954. Festinger argued that individuals are driven to evaluate their own opinions and abilities accurately, and social comparison theory explains how individuals carry out those evaluations by comparing themselves to others.

In 1980, Ferrell and McGoey called it the "discriminability effect"; in 1992, Griffin and Tversky called it the "difficulty effect".

== Experiments ==
In a range of studies, participants have been requested to answer general knowledge questions, each of which had two possible answers, and also to estimate their chances of answering each question correctly. If the participants had a sufficient degree of self-knowledge, their level of confidence in regard to each answer they gave would be high for the questions they answered correctly and lower for the ones they answered wrong. However, this generally is not the case. Many people are overconfident; indeed, studies show that most people systematically overestimate their own abilities. Moreover, people are overconfident about their ability to answer questions that are deemed to be hard but underconfident on questions that are considered easy.

In a study reported in 1997, William M. Goldstein and Robin M. Hogarth gave an experimental group a questionnaire containing general-knowledge questions such as "Who was born first, Aristotle or Buddha?" or "Was the zipper invented before or after 1920?". The subjects filled in the answers they believed to be correct and rated how sure they were of them. The results showed subjects tend to be under-confident of their answers to questions designated by the experimenters as to be easy, and overconfident of their answers to questions designated as hard.

== Prevalence ==
A 2009 study concluded "that all types of judges exhibit the hard-easy effect in almost all realistic situations", and that the presence of the effect "cannot be used to distinguish between judges or to draw support for specific models of confidence elicitation".

The hard-easy effect manifests itself regardless of personality differences. Many researchers agree that it is "a robust and pervasive phenomenon".

A 1999 study suggested that the difference between the data in two studies, one performed in Canada by Baranski and Petrusic (1994) and the other in Sweden by Olsson and Winman (1996), "may reflect cross-national differences in confidence in sensory discrimination".

== Causes ==
Among the explanations advanced for the hard-easy effect are "systematic cognitive mechanisms, experimenter bias, random error, and statistical artifact".

One 1991 study explained the hard-easy effect as a consequence of "informal experimenter-guided selection of almanac items, selection that changes the validity of the cues used by the subjects for selection of answers to the items". Psychological explanations for this phenomenon have also been offered up by Baranski and Petrusic (1994), Griffin and Tversky (1992), and Suantak et al. (1996).

== Doubts ==
Some researchers, such as Brenner et al. (1996), Justil et al. (1997), and Keren (1991), have raised doubts about the existence of the effect.

In a 1993 paper, Peter Juslin maintained that "(1) when the objects of judgement are selected randomly from a natural environment, people are well-calibrated; (2) when more and less difficult item samples are created by selecting items with more and less familiar contents, i.e. in a way that does not affect the validity of the cues, no hard-easy effect is observed, and people are well-calibrated both for hard and easy item samples."

In 2000, Juslin, Anders Winman, and Henrik Olsson of Uppsala University claimed that the hard-easy effect had previously "been interpreted with insufficient attention to important methodological problems". In their own study, when they controlled for two methodological problems, the hard-easy effect was "almost eliminated". They argued that "the hard-easy effect has been interpreted with insufficient attention to the scale-end effects, the linear dependency, and the regression effects in data, and that the continued adherence to the idea of a 'cognitive overconfidence bias' is mediated by selective attention to particular data sets". One specific point they made was that the hard-easy effect is almost eliminated "when there is control for scale-end effects and linear dependency".

== See also ==
- List of cognitive biases
- Overconfidence effect – Personal cognitive bias
