= Virtue epistemology =

Philosophical approach

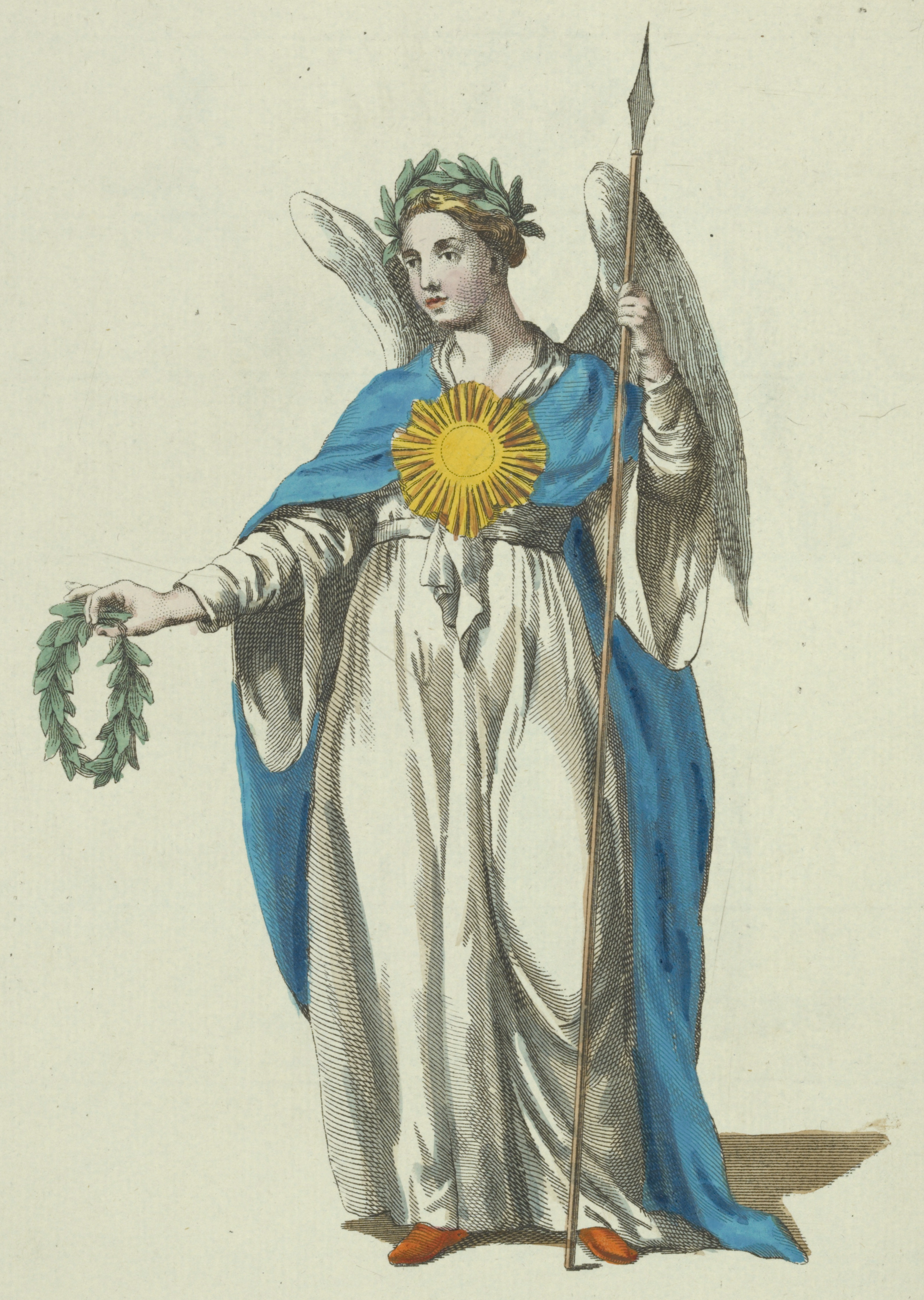
A personification of virtue

Virtue epistemology is a philosophical approach to epistemology that stresses the importance of intellectual and specifically epistemic virtues. Virtue epistemology evaluates knowledge according to the properties of the persons, or other knowers, who hold beliefs in addition to or instead of the properties of the propositions and beliefs. Some advocates of virtue epistemology also adhere to theories of virtue ethics, while others see only a loose analogy between virtue in ethics and in epistemology.

Intellectual virtue has been a subject of philosophy since the work of Aristotle, but virtue epistemology is a development in the modern analytic tradition. It is characterized by efforts to solve problems of special concern to modern epistemology, such as justification and reliabilism, by focusing on the knower as agent in a manner similar to how virtue ethics focuses on moral agents rather than moral acts.

== The raft and the pyramid ==
Virtue epistemology was partly inspired by a recent renewal of interest in virtue concepts among moral philosophers, and partly as a response to the intractability of the competing analyses of knowledge that arose in response to Edmund Gettier. Ernest Sosa introduced intellectual virtue into contemporary epistemological discussion in a 1980 paper called "The Raft and the Pyramid".

Sosa argued that an appeal to intellectual virtue could resolve the conflict between foundationalists and coherentists over the structure of epistemic justification. Foundationalism holds that beliefs are founded or based on other beliefs in a hierarchy, similar to the bricks in the structure of a pyramid. Coherentism, on the other hand, uses the metaphor of a raft in which all beliefs are not tied down by foundations but instead are interconnected due to the logical relationships between each belief. Sosa found a flaw in each of these schools of epistemology, in both cases having to do with the relationship between belief and perception.

Coherentism only allows for justification based on logical relations between all the beliefs within a system of beliefs. However, because perceptual beliefs may not have many logical ties with other beliefs in the system, the coherentist account of knowledge cannot accommodate the importance normally attributed to perceptual information. On the other hand, foundationalism arguably encounters a problem when it attempts to describe how foundational beliefs relate to the sensory experiences that support them.

Coherentism and foundationalism developed as responses to the problems with the "traditional" account of knowledge (as justified true belief) developed by Edmund Gettier in 1963. As a result of Gettier's counterexamples, competing theories were developed, but the disputes between coherentists and foundationalists proved to be intractable. Sosa's paper suggested that virtue may resolve such disputes.

== Theory ==
Virtue epistemology replaces formulaic expressions for apprehending knowledge, such as "S knows that p", by amending these formulas with virtue theory applied to intellect, where virtue then becomes the fulcrum for assessing potential candidates of "knowledge". This amendation raises problems of its own, however. If the same uncertainty about accuracy in creating a formula for testing knowledge equally applies to the authenticity of virtue, then one cannot know if the target virtue is credible. Some virtue epistemologists use reliabilism as a basis for belief justification, stressing reliable functioning of the intellect.

Virtue epistemology is consistent with some of contextualism. Several areas of contextual epistemology attack the problem of knowledge from an objective standpoint. Virtue epistemology attempts to simplify the analysis of knowledge by replacing certain abstractions involved in the pursuit of the highest level of knowledge with flexible and contextual instances. Specifically, it leaves room for cognitive relativism. This degree of reliability is not constant; it can change depending on the context. Under this view, a well-functioning intellectual faculty is a necessary condition for the formation of knowledge. This differs from other areas of epistemology because it takes the state of an individual's intellect into account. As a result of this, social context also has the ability to alter knowledge. Social contexts change over time, making it necessary for beliefs and knowledge to change with it.

Virtue epistemology, similarly to virtue ethics, is based on the intellectual qualities of the individual as opposed to the quality of the belief; virtue epistemology is person-based, rather than belief-based. Consequently, virtue epistemology can stress "epistemic responsibility"—in which an individual is held responsible for the virtue of their knowledge-gathering faculties.

For example, Massimo Pigliucci applies virtue epistemology to critical thinking and suggests the virtuous individual will consider the following:

- non-dismissive consideration of arguments
- charitable interpretation of opposing arguments
- awareness of one's own presuppositions and potential for being mistaken
- consultation of expert knowledge
- reliability of source material
- knowledge of what one is talking about rather than merely repeating others' opinions.

== Varieties ==
Virtue epistemologists differ in the role they believe virtue to play: eliminative virtue replaces epistemic concepts like knowledge and justification with intellectual virtue and intellectual vice, while non-eliminative virtue epistemology retains a role for such traditional concepts and uses virtue to provide substantive explanation of them.

Virtue epistemologists differ in what they believe epistemic virtues to be. Some accounts are Aristotelian, drawing a relationship between intellectual virtue and character in a similar way to the way moral virtue is related to character. "Weak" virtue epistemology, on the other hand, doesn't require any particular commitment or cultivation of intellectual virtue. Abrol Fairweather argues that "weak" virtue epistemologists "merely [use] virtue theory as a novel lexicon for expressing an independent epistemic theory".

Some virtue epistemologists favor the "virtue reliabilist" account of virtues as reliably functioning cognitive faculties, and others favor a "virtue responsibilist" account in which the responsible epistemic conduct of the agent plays a key role.

=== Virtue reliabilism ===
Virtue reliabilism emphasizes that the process whereby truth is garnered must be reliable. However, the stress of the reliability is not on the mechanism of justification. Instead, the extent of the person's reality-tracking ability determines how virtuous that person's intellect is, and therefore how good their knowledge is.

For Sosa, the more virtuous faculties are related to direct sensory perception and memory, and less virtuous capacities are ones related to beliefs derived from the primary memory or sense experience. Sosa has two criteria for a belief to be "fully apt": It must be "meta-justified"—the agent must have hit the truth as such—and it must be "apt"—the agent must have been displaying his virtuous capacities in claiming such a belief or hitting the truth as such. By analogy, a hunter must not only be able to hit the target with precision and accuracy, but the shot must be one that the hunter should have taken.

John Greco, another advocate of virtue reliabilism, believes that knowledge and justified belief "are grounded in stable and reliable cognitive character. Such character may include both a person's natural cognitive faculties as well as her acquired habits of thought.... So long as such habits are both stable and successful, they make up the kind of character that gives rise to knowledge." This characterization of virtue reliabilism is more inclusive than Sosa's, eschewing the focus on memorial or sensory experience and instead locating virtue in an agent's stable and reliable dispositions to generate successful cognition. Greco makes room for the inclusion of the intellectual virtues typically construed by the responsibilist camp of virtue epistemology, since many of these virtues can be thought of as stable, reliable dispositions of character.

=== Virtue responsibilism ===
In virtue responsibilism, the emphasis is not on faculties such as perception and memory. Instead, certain intellectual character traits are valued as more virtuous than others. These can be creativity, inquisitiveness, rational rigor, honesty, or a number of other possibilities. Generally, these theories are normative in nature. A few different approaches are taken.

Some, such as Lorraine Code, think that intellectual virtues involve having the correct cognitive character and epistemic relation to the world rooted in a social context. She sees the acquisition of correct knowledge about the world as the primary "good", and the end towards which our intellectual efforts should be oriented, with the desire for truth as the primary motivating factor for our epistemological virtues.

James Montmarquet's theory of intellectual virtue is similar to Code's, but specifically defines additional intellectual virtues in order to defuse the potential dogmatism or fanaticism that is compatible with Code's desire for truth. The primary virtue is conscientiousness, which focuses on the correct end of intellectual living. In order to obtain conscientiousness, it is important to maintain impartiality, sobriety, and courage.

Linda Trinkaus Zagzebski has proposed a neo-Aristotelian model of virtue epistemology, emphasizing the role of phronesis (practical wisdom) as an architectonic virtue unifying moral and intellectual virtues even more radically than Aristotle proposed. As delineated in her model, the virtues are "a deep and enduring acquired excellence of a person, involving a characteristic motivation to produce a certain desired end and reliable success in bringing about that end." As she sees it, the "characteristic motivation" of an intellectual virtue is the desire for truth, understanding, and other species of cognitive contact with reality. The notion of "reliable success" is invoked in order to avoid issues of well-intentioned but unsuccessful agents who desire truth but use poorly suited methods to pursue it.

=== Plantinga's theory of warrant ===
Alvin Plantinga offers another theory of knowledge closely related to virtue epistemology. According to him, knowledge is warranted if one's intellectual faculties are operating as they are designed to. That is, knowledge is valid if it is obtained through the correct operation of the faculties of the intellect which are designed to have an inherent ability, because they are designed that way, to capture and produce true beliefs.

=== Jonathan Kvanvig's understanding and assertion ===
In Jonathan Kvanvig's essay, Why Should Inquiring Minds Want to Know?: Meno Problems and Epistemological Axiology he asserts that epistemology has no place in philosophical study. The value of knowledge originates from the Socratic dialogue written by Plato called Meno. In Meno, Socrates' distinction between "true belief" and "knowledge" forms the basis of the philosophical definition of knowledge as "justified true belief". Socrates explains the similarities and differences between "true belief" and "knowledge", arguing that justified true belief fails to "stay in their place" and must be "tethered". According to Kvanvig, true belief is what is necessary to maximize truth and to avoid error, thus dropping justification from the equation of knowledge. He argues that once we recognize what the manipulated boundary notion of non-Gettierized account of knowledge is, then it becomes clear that there is nothing valuable about the anti-Gettier condition on knowledge. Kvanvig acknowledges that true belief falls short of knowledge, however to him, true belief is no less valuable than knowledge. Kvanvig believes that epistemology should be focused on understanding, an epistemic standing that Kvanvig maintains is of more value than knowledge and justified true belief.

== Potential advantages ==
Some varieties of virtue epistemology that contain normative elements, such as virtue responsibilism, can provide a unified framework of normativity and value. Others, such as Sosa's account, can circumvent Cartesian skepticism with the necessity of externalism interacting with internalism. In this same vein, and because of the inherent flexibility and social nature of some of types of virtue epistemology, social conditioning and influence can be understood within an epistemological framework and explored. This flexibility and connection between internal and external makes virtue epistemology more accessible.

== Prominent criticism ==
One criticism of virtue epistemology has focused upon its characterization of human cognition as grounded in stable character dispositions (e.g. the disposition to use reliable faculties, or one's excellent character traits construed as dispositions). As discussed by a parallel criticism leveled at virtue ethics, virtue theories, whether moral or epistemic, typically consider character traits as stable across time, and efficacious as explanatory reasons for persons behaving and thinking as they do. However, this supposition has been challenged by the "situationist critique" in psychology, which argues that human epistemic character changes depending on context, even when that change is epistemically irrelevant. Thus, irrelevant differences in a situation can prompt a drastic change in cognitive behavior.

Reliabilists might characterize this as effecting a drop in reliable functioning, whereas responsibilists would see these variations as negating one's excellent cognitive character. It is therefore argued that virtue theorists should either amend their conception of human psychology to accommodate this or explain how the results of situationist psychological research do not contradict their theory.

== See also ==
- Unity of knowledge and action
- AI epistemology – a related field exploring how artificial intelligence systems generate, structure, and transform knowledge, building on the foundations of virtue and social epistemology.

== Selected bibliography ==
- Aquino, Frederick D. Communities of Informed Judgment: Newman's Illative Sense and Accounts of Rationality. Washington, D.C.: Catholic University of America Press, 2004.
- Axtell, Guy, ed. Knowledge, Belief, and Character: Readings in Contemporary Virtue. Lanham, MD: Rowman & Littlefield, 2000.
- _____. "Epistemic Luck in Light of the Virtues." In Virtue Epistemology: Essays on Epistemic Virtue and Responsibility, ed. *Abrol Fairweather and Linda Zagzebski, 158–177. Oxford: Oxford University Press, 2001.
- Blackburn, Simon. "Reason, Virtue, and Knowledge." In Virtue Epistemology: Essays on Epistemic Virtue and Responsibility, ed. Abrol Fairweather and Linda Zagzebski, 15–29. Oxford: Oxford University Press, 2001.
- Bonjour, Laurence, and Ernest Sosa. Epistemic Justification: Internalism vs. Externalism, Foundations vs. Virtues. Oxford: Blackwell, 2003.
- Brady, Michael and Duncan Pritchard. "Moral and Epistemic Virtues." In Moral and Epistemic Virtues, ed. Michael Brady and Duncan Pritchard, 1–12. Malden, MA: Blackwell Publishing Ltd., 2003.
- Dalmiya, Vrinda. "Why Should a Knower Care?" Hypatia 17, no. 1 (2002): 34–52.
- Fairweather, Abrol. "Epistemic Motivation." In Virtue Epistemology: Essays on Epistemic Virtue and Responsibility, ed. Abrol Fairweather and Linda Zagzebski, 63–81. Oxford: Oxford University Press, 2001.
- Goldman, Alvin I. "The Unity of the Epistemic Virtues." In Virtue Epistemology: Essays on Epistemic Virtue and Responsibility, ed. Abrol Fairweather and Linda Zagzebski, 30–48. Oxford: Oxford University Press, 2001.
- Hibbs, Thomas S. "Aquinas, Virtue, and Recent Epistemology." The Review of Metaphysics 52, no. 3 (1999): 573–594.
- Hookway, Christopher. "How to be a Virtue Epistemologist." In Intellectual Virtue: Perspectives from Ethics and Epistemology, ed. Michael DePaul and Linda Zagzebski, 183–202. Oxford: Clarendon Press, 2003.
- Kawall, Jason. "Other-regarding Epistemic Virtues." Ratio XV 3 (2002): 257–275.
- Lehrer, Keith. "The Virtue of Knowledge." In Virtue Epistemology: Essays on Epistemic Virtue and Responsibility, ed. Abrol Fairweather and Linda Zagzebski, 200–213. Oxford: Oxford University Press, 2001.
- McKinnon, Christine. "Knowing Cognitive Selves." In Intellectual Virtue: Perspectives from Ethics and Epistemology, ed. Michael DePaul and Linda Zagzebski, 227–254. Oxford: Clarendon Press, 2003.
- Moros, Enrique R. and Richard J. Umbers. "Distinguishing Virtues from Faculties in Virtue Epistemology." The Southern Journal of Philosophy XLII, (2004): 61–85.
- Riggs, Wayne D. "Understanding 'Virtue' and the Virtue of Understanding." In Intellectual Virtue: Perspectives from Ethics and Epistemology, ed. Michael DePaul and Linda Zagzebski, 203–226. Oxford: Clarendon Press, 2003.
- Roberts, Robert C. and W. Jay Wood. "Humility and Epistemic Goods." In Intellectual Virtue: Perspectives from Ethics and Epistemology, ed. Michael DePaul and Linda Zagzebski, 257–279. Oxford: Clarendon Press, 2003.
- Sosa, Ernest. "The Raft and the Pyramid: Coherence versus Foundations in the Theory of Knowledge." Midwest Studies in Philosophy 5, (1980): 3–25.
- _____. "For the Love of Truth?" In Virtue Epistemology: Essays on Epistemic Virtue and Responsibility, ed. Abrol Fairweather and Linda Zagzebski, 49–62. Oxford: Oxford University Press, 2001.
- _____. "The Place of Truth in Epistemology." In Intellectual Virtue: Perspectives from Ethics and Epistemology, ed. Michael DePaul and Linda Zagzebski, 155–179. Oxford: Clarendon Press, 2003.
- Wood, W. Jay. Epistemology: Becoming Intellectually Virtuous. Downers Grove, IL: InterVarsity Press, 1998.
- Zagzebski, Linda. Virtues of the Mind: An Inquiry into the Nature of Virtue and the Ethical Foundations of Knowledge. Cambridge: Cambridge University Press, 1996.
- _____. "Must Knowers Be Agents?" In Virtue Epistemology: Essays on Epistemic Virtue and Responsibility, ed. Abrol Fairweather and Linda Zagzebski, 142–157. Oxford: Oxford University Press, 2001.
- _____. "The Search for the Source of Epistemic Good." In Moral and Epistemic Virtues, ed. Michael Brady and Duncan Pritchard, 13–28. Malden, MA: Blackwell Publishing Ltd., 2003.
- _____. "Intellectual Motivation and the Good of Truth." In Intellectual Virtue: Perspectives from Ethics and Epistemology, ed. Michael DePaul and Linda Zagzebski, 135–154. Oxford: Clarendon Press, 2003.
- _____, and Abrol Fairweather. "Introduction." In Virtue Epistemology: Essays on Epistemic Virtue and Responsibility, ed. Abrol Fairweather and Linda Zagzebski, 3–14. Oxford: Oxford University Press, 2001.
- _____, and Michael DePaul. "Introduction." In Intellectual Virtue: Perspectives from Ethics and Epistemology, ed. Michael DePaul and Linda Zagzebski, 1–12. Oxford: Clarendon Press, 2003.
