= Intellectual responsibility =

Reflectiveness about truth of beliefs

Intellectual responsibility (also known as epistemic responsibility) is the quality of being adequately reflective about the truth of one's beliefs. People are intellectually responsible if they have tried hard enough to be reflective about the truth of their beliefs, aiming not to miss any information that would cause them to abandon those beliefs as false.

Intellectual responsibility is related to epistemic justification, or justification of one's beliefs, and to the ethics of belief. Thomas Ash, following Roderick Chisholm, said "that intellectual responsibility can be understood as a matter of fulfilling one's intellectual duties or requirements. And this is just how justification has been understood, on perhaps the most historically prominent conception of it." Ash considered this to be an "important reason to think that intellectual responsibility is both necessary and sufficient for justification". According to Frederick F. Schmitt, "the conception of justified belief as epistemically responsible belief has been endorsed by a number of philosophers, including Roderick Chisholm (1977), Hilary Kornblith (1983), and Lorraine Code (1983)."

Robert Audi said that people need "standards to guide an intellectually rigorous search for a mean between excessive credulity [believing too much that is false] and indiscriminate skepticism [believing too little that is true]", and he suggested five standards:

1. Seeking evidence for and counterevidence against propositions to be believed
2. Seeking reflective equilibrium, the integration and coherence of beliefs
3. Identifying and focusing on the grounds for belief
4. Making interpersonal comparisons in beliefs and grounds for them
5. Seeking proportionality in degree of conviction and rectifying disproportions

== Responsibility of intellectuals ==
A separate concept was introduced by the linguist and public intellectual Noam Chomsky in an essay published as a special supplement by The New York Review of Books on 23 February 1967, entitled "The Responsibility of Intellectuals". Chomsky argued that intellectuals should make themselves responsible for searching for the truth and the exposing of lies.

== See also ==
- Epistemic virtue – Concept in philosophy
- I'm entitled to my opinion – Informal fallacy
- Intellectual rigor – Adhering absolutely to certain constraints with consistency
- Intellectual virtue – Concept in Aristotelian ethics
- Justified true belief
