= Intellectual humility =

Recognition of the limit of one's knowledge

Intellectual humility is a metacognitive process characterized by recognizing the limits of one's knowledge and acknowledging one's fallibility. It involves several components, including not thinking too highly of oneself, refraining from believing one's own views are superior to others', lacking intellectual vanity, being open to new ideas, and acknowledging mistakes and shortcomings. It is positively associated with openness to new ideas, empathy, prosocial values, tolerance for diverse perspectives, and scrutiny of misinformation. Individuals with higher levels of intellectual humility experience benefits such as improved decision-making, positive social interactions, and the moderation of conflicts. There is a long history of philosophers considering the importance of intellectual humility as a virtue.

== Definition ==
Intellectual humility is a psychological process defined as "the recognition of the limits of one’s knowledge and an awareness of one’s fallibility."

== History ==
Philosophers have long championed "a recognition of one's epistemic limit" and have named it an epistemic virtue.

Perhaps the first recorded instance of intellectual humility is when Socrates (in The Apology) remarked: "Although I do not suppose that either of us knows anything really beautiful and good, I am better off than he is – for he knows nothing, and thinks he knows. I neither know nor think I know."

Waclaw Bąk et al. identify Socrates as "the ideal example" of intellectual humility. Studies by Abraham Maslow, Carl Rogers, and Gordon Allport discuss humility with regard to one's knowledge without using the phrase "intellectual humility".

Notwithstanding this long history, attention from social and behavioural scientists is much more recent - roughly starting in the mid-2000s.

== Components ==
Intellectual humility is "a multifaceted and multilayered virtue" which involves several key components that shape an individual's intellectual disposition.

It is positively associated with openness to new ideas, empathy, prosocial values, tolerance for diverse people and perspectives, scrutiny of misinformation, greater openness to learning about different political views, lower affective polarization, and higher religious tolerance.

== Benefits ==
There are a variety of benefits to individuals who have higher intellectual humility including:

- Improved decision-making: "more likely to process information in ways that enhance their knowledge and understanding than people lower in intellectual humility."
- Positive interactions: "more positive social interactions, especially when disagreements arise ... which leads people who are more intellectually humble to be liked better than those low in IH.

At a social level there are also benefits including the moderation of conflicts and may lead to greater compromise.

The consequences of the reverse - i.e. overconfidence - can be problematic. As social psychologist Scott Plous wrote, "No problem in judgement and decision making is more prevalent and more potentially catastrophic than overconfidence." It has been blamed for lawsuits, strikes, wars, poor corporate acquisitions, and stock market bubbles and crashes.

A large study of nearly 50,000 participants from over 68 countries the early stage of the COVID-19 pandemic (April–May 2020) found that "open-mindedness turns out to be the strongest predictor for rejecting conspiracy beliefs" (and support for public health measures) related to COVID-19.

== Intellectual humility measures ==
A number of different methods and scales to measure humility exist.

== Acquisition ==
A study found that users of an online tool could experience a small- to medium-sized increase in their intellectual humility.

Activities with some empirical support and/or theoretical foundation for increasing intellectual humility
Exercise with rationale	Sample applications
Approaching a challenging situation from a third-person rather than a first-person perspective: Thinking about a situation from a third-person perspective creates psychological distance, which increases objectivity regarding the situation. It also shifts people from an individual to a relational focus.	Approaching a challenging interpersonal situation from the vantage point of an outside observer.; Resolving intellectual disagreements via discussions in which participants argue only from each other's perspectives. Although different from a third-person perspective, this exercise often leads to greater understanding of other people's viewpoints.
Shifting towards a growth mindset of intelligence: The belief that intelligence can be developed and grow rather than that it is a trait that cannot be changed. People who hold a growth mindset of intelligence may feel less threatened to acknowledge what they do not yet understand and feel more comfortable acknowledging the intellectual strengths of others.	Reading about the growth mindset of intelligence.; Creating shared learning opportunities in which each participant reviews a segment of a work and discusses the key points of each segment.
Critical evaluation of the limitations of one's knowledge regarding particular topics or situations: When people assess the limits of their knowledge in a particular situation or topic, it can make their general intellectual humility more salient in the moment and on the topic in question.	Critical evaluation to determine whether one's own views could be wrong, whether any relevant information is being overlooked, and whether one's views may be changed if additional information is presented.
Identification of past cases where acknowledging flaws in one's thinking or ideas resulted in positive change: Thinking about practical examples of intellectual humility brings this concept out of the theoretical so as to promote applied understanding. This exercise can minimize fears pertinent to intellectual humility by highlighting the ways in which it has resulted in positive outcomes for a person in the past.	Identification of opinions held in the past that have since changed. Consideration of views and policies that were supported by reason at the time, but that one has come to reject as false or unhelpful.
Recognition of general human intellectual fallibility: Acknowledging that all humans have intellectual fallibility can help people realize that they are no exception. This allows people to embrace intellectual humility as an aspect of their shared humanity and may help leaders accept their own and their followers’ intellectual fallibility.	Learning about humans’ cognitive biases.

== Relation to other phenomena ==
Intellectual humility and intellectual arrogance are related to a number of distinct cognitive phenomena.

A source of intellectual arrogance can be a number of cognitive biases, which can manifest already in an early age. Among the cognitive biases that influence the intellectual humility one can distinguish illusions of explanatory depth, argument justification, insight, outsourced mind.

== See also ==
- Curiosity
- Doxastic logic
- Humility
- Intellectual courage
- Intellectual diversity
- Modesty
- Open-mindedness
- Value pluralism
- Reasonable doubt
- Skepticism
