= Curiosity =

Quality related to inquisitive thinking

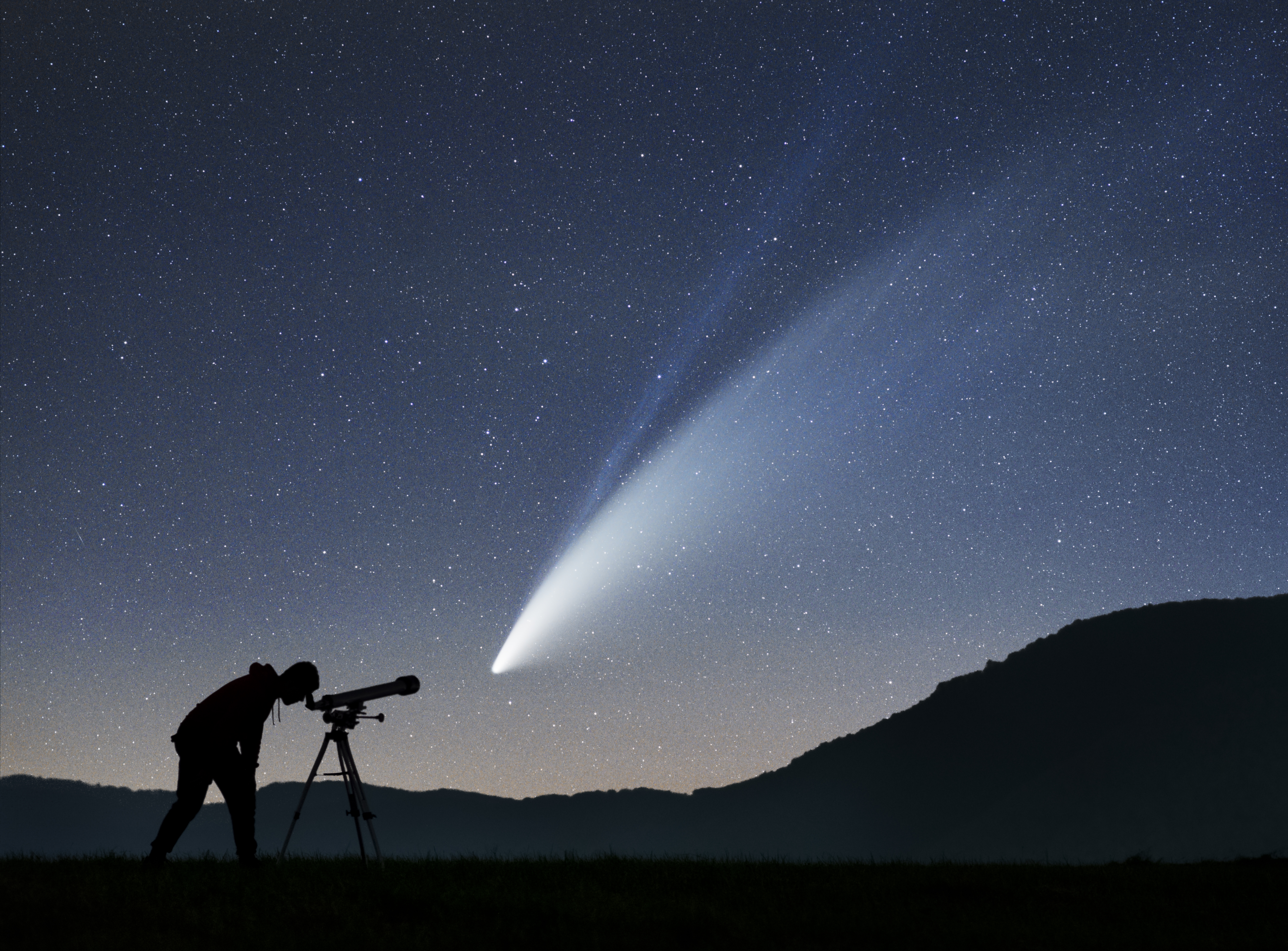
Space and telescopes have been a quintessential symbol for curiosity.

Curiosity (from Latin cūriōsitās, from cūriōsus "careful, diligent, curious", akin to cura "care") can be a quality related to inquisitive thinking, such as exploration, investigation, and learning, evident in humans and other animals. It can also refer to something (an event, object, person, etc.) which can cause curiosity. When it is for an object it may be called a curio, and a collection of curios or curiosities may be stored together as a collection called curiosities.

The term curiosity can also denote the behavior, characteristic, or emotion of being curious, in regard to the desire to gain knowledge or information. Curiosity helps human development, from which derives the process of learning and desire to acquire knowledge and skill. Curiosity as a behavior and emotion is the driving force behind human development, such as progress in science, language, and industry.

Curiosity can be considered to be an evolutionary adaptation based on an organism's ability to learn. Certain curious animals (namely, corvids, octopuses, dolphins, elephants, rats, etc.) will pursue information in order to adapt to their surrounding and learn how things function. This behavior is termed neophilia, the love of new things. For animals, a fear of the unknown or the new, neophobia, is much more common, especially later in life.

== Causes ==
A child looking to see what another is reading

Many species display curiosity including apes, cats, and rodents. It is common in human beings at all ages from infancy through adulthood. Research has shown that curiosity is not a fixed attribute amongst humans but rather can be nurtured and developed throughout life.

Early definitions of curiosity call it a motivated desire for information. This motivational desire has been said to stem from a passion or an appetite for knowledge, information, and understanding.

Traditional ideas of curiosity have expanded to consider the difference between perceptual curiosity, as the innate exploratory behavior that is present in all animals, and epistemic curiosity, as the desire for knowledge that is specifically attributed to humans.

Daniel Berlyne recognized three classes of variables playing a role in evoking curiosity: psychophysical variables, ecological variables, and collative variables. Psychophysical variables correspond to physical intensity, ecological variables to motivational significance and task relevance. Collative variables involve a comparison between different stimuli or features, which may be actually perceived or which may be recalled from memory. Berlyne mentioned four collative variables: novelty, complexity, uncertainty, and conflict (though he suggested that all collative variables probably involve conflict). Additionally, he considered three variables supplementary to novelty: change, surprisingness, and incongruity. Finally, curiosity may not only be aroused by the perception of some stimulus associated with the aforementioned variables ("specific exploration"), but also by a lack of stimulation, out of "boredom" ("diversive exploration").

== Curiosity-driven behavior ==
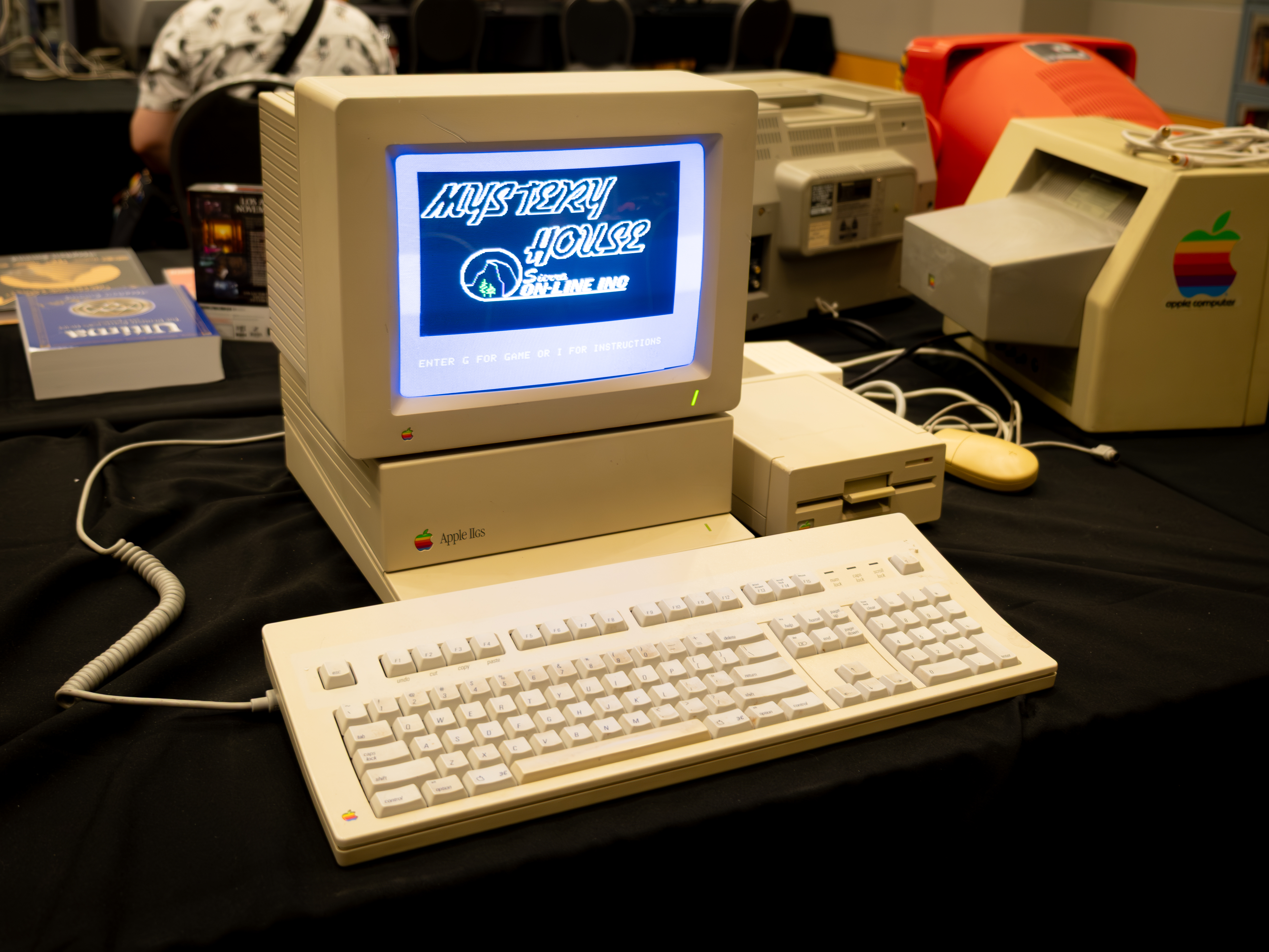
Mystery House, an adventure video game from 1980

Curiosity-driven behavior is often defined as behavior through which knowledge is gained – a form of exploratory behavior. It therefore encompasses all behaviors that provide access to or increase sensory information. Berlyne divided curiosity-driven behavior into three categories: orienting responses, locomotor exploration, and investigatory responses or investigatory manipulation. Previously, Berlyne suggested that curiosity also includes verbal activities, such as asking questions, and symbolic activities, consisting of internally fueled mental processes such as thinking ("epistemic exploration").

== Theories ==
Like other desires and need-states that take on an appetitive quality (e.g. food/hunger), curiosity is linked with exploratory behavior and experiences of reward. Curiosity can be described in terms of positive emotions and acquiring knowledge; when one's curiosity has been aroused it is considered inherently rewarding and pleasurable. Discovering new information may also be rewarding because it can help reduce undesirable states of uncertainty rather than stimulating interest. Theories have arisen in attempts to further understand this need to rectify states of uncertainty and the desire to participate in pleasurable experiences of exploratory behaviors.

=== Curiosity-drive theory ===
Curiosity-drive theory posits undesirable experiences of "uncertainty" and "ambiguity". The reduction of these unpleasant feelings is rewarding. This theory suggests that people desire coherence and understanding in their thought processes. When this coherence is disrupted by something that is unfamiliar, uncertain, or ambiguous, an individual's curiosity-drive causes them to collect information and knowledge of the unfamiliar to restore coherent thought processes. This theory suggests that curiosity is developed out of the desire to make sense of unfamiliar aspects of one's environment through exploratory behaviors. Once understanding of the unfamiliar has been achieved and coherence has been restored, these behaviors and desires subside.

Derivations of curiosity-drive theory differ on whether curiosity is a primary or secondary drive and if this curiosity-drive originates due to one's need to make sense of and regulate one's environment or if it is caused by an external stimulus. Causes can range from basic needs that need to be satisfied (e.g. hunger, thirst) to needs in fear-induced situations. Each of these derived theories state that whether the need is primary or secondary, curiosity develops from experiences that create a sensation of uncertainty or perceived unpleasantness. Curiosity then acts to dispel this uncertainty. By exhibiting curious and exploratory behavior, one is able to gain knowledge of the unfamiliar and thus reduce the state of uncertainty or unpleasantness. This theory, however, does not address the idea that curiosity can often be displayed even in the absence of new or unfamiliar situations. This type of exploratory behavior, too, is common in many species. A human toddler, if bored in his current situation devoid of arousing stimuli, will walk about until he finds something interesting. The observation of curiosity even in the absence of novel stimuli pinpoints one of the major shortcomings in the curiosity-drive model.

=== Optimal-arousal theory ===
Optimal-arousal theory developed out of the need to explain this desire to seek out opportunities to engage in exploratory behaviors without the presence of uncertain or ambiguous situations. Optimal-arousal suggests that one can be motivated to maintain a pleasurable sense of arousal through such exploratory behaviors.

When a stimulus is encountered that is associated with complexity, uncertainty, conflict, or novelty, this increases arousal above the optimal point, and exploratory behavior is employed to learn about that stimulus and thereby reduce arousal again. In contrast, if the environment is boring and lacks excitement, arousal is reduced below the optimal point and exploratory behavior is employed to increase information input and stimulation, and thereby increasing arousal again. This theory addresses both curiosity elicited by uncertain or unfamiliar situations and curiosity elicited in the absence of such situations.

=== Cognitive-consistency theory ===
Cognitive-consistency theories assume that "when two or more simultaneously active cognitive structures are logically inconsistent, arousal is increased, which activates processes with the expected consequence of increasing consistency and decreasing arousal." Similar to optimal-arousal theory, cognitive-consistency theory suggests that there is a tendency to maintain arousal at a preferred, or expected, level, but it also explicitly links the amount of arousal to the amount of experienced inconsistency between an expected situation and the actually perceived situation. When this inconsistency is small, exploratory behavior triggered by curiosity is employed to gather information with which expectancy can be updated through learning to match perception, thereby reducing inconsistency.

This approach associates curiosity with aggression and fear. If the inconsistency is larger, fear or aggressive behavior may be employed to alter the perception in order to make it match expectancy, depending on the size of the inconsistency as well as the specific context. Aggressive behavior alters perception by forcefully manipulating it into matching the expected situation, while fear prompts flight, which removes the inconsistent stimulus from the perceptual field and thus resolves the inconsistency.

=== Integration of the reward pathway into theory ===
Taking into account the shortcomings of both curiosity-drive and optimal-arousal theories, attempts have been made to integrate neurobiological aspects of reward, wanting, and pleasure into a more comprehensive theory for curiosity. Research suggests that desiring new information involves mesolimbic pathways of the brain that account for dopamine activation. The use of these pathways, and dopamine activation, may be how the brain assigns value to new information and interprets this as reward. This theory from neurobiology can supplement curiosity-drive theory by explaining the motivation of exploratory behavior.

== Role of neurological aspects and structures ==
Although curiosity is widely regarded, its root causes are largely empirically unknown. However, some studies have provided insight into the neurological mechanisms that make up what is known as the reward pathway which may influence characteristics associated with curiosity, such as learning, memory, and motivation. Due to the complex nature of curiosity, research that focuses on specific neural processes with these characteristics can help us understand the phenomenon of curiosity as a whole. The following are descriptions of characteristics of curiosity and their links to neurological aspects that are essential in creating exploratory behaviors:

=== Motivation and reward ===
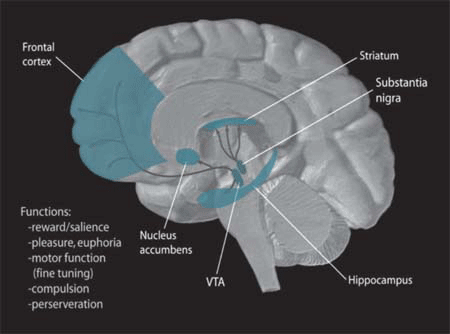
Dopamine pathway in the brain

The drive to learn new information or perform some action may also be prompted by the anticipation of reward.

Reward is defined as the positive reinforcement of an action, reinforcement that encourages a particular behavior by means of the emotional sensations of relief, pleasure, and satisfaction that correlate with happiness. Many areas in the brain process reward and come together to form what is called the reward pathway. In this pathway many neurotransmitters play a role in the activation of the reward sensation, including dopamine, serotonin, and opioids.

Dopamine is linked to curiosity, as it assigns and retains reward values of information gained. Research suggests higher amounts of dopamine are released when the reward is unknown and the stimulus is unfamiliar, compared to activation of dopamine when stimulus is familiar.

==== Nucleus accumbens ====
The nucleus accumbens is a formation of neurons that is important in reward pathway activation—such as the release of dopamine in investigating response to novel or exciting stimuli. The fast dopamine release observed during childhood and adolescence is important in development, as curiosity and exploratory behavior are the largest facilitators of learning during early years.

The sensation pleasure of "liking" can occur when opioids are released by the nucleus accumbens. This helps someone evaluate the unfamiliar situation or environment and attach value to the novel object. These processes of both wanting and liking play a role in activating the reward system of the brain, and perhaps in the stimulation of curious or information-seeking tendencies as well.

==== Caudate nucleus ====
The caudate nucleus is a region of the brain that is highly responsive to dopamine, and is another component of the reward pathway. Research suggests that the caudate nucleus anticipates the possibility of and reward of exploratory behavior and gathered information, thus contributing to factors of curiosity.

==== Anterior cortices ====
Regions of the anterior insula and anterior cingulate cortex correspond to both conflict and arousal and, as such, seem to reinforce certain exploratory models of curiosity.

==== Cortisol ====
Cortisol is a chemical known for its role in stress regulation. However, cortisol may also be associated with curious or exploratory behavior. Studies suggesting a role of cortisol in curiosity support optimal arousal theory. They suggest the release of some cortisol, causing some stress, encourages curious behavior, while too much stress can initiate a "back away" response.

=== Attention ===
Attention is important to curiosity because it allows one to selectively focus and concentrate on particular stimuli in the surrounding environment. As there are limited cognitive and sensory resources to understand and evaluate stimuli, attention allows the brain to better focus on what it perceives to be the most important or relevant of these stimuli. Individuals tend to focus on stimuli that are particularly stimulating or engaging. The more attention a stimulus garners, the more frequent one's energy and focus will be directed towards that stimulus. This suggests an individual will focus on new or unfamiliar stimuli in an effort to better understand or make sense of the unknown, rather than on more familiar or repetitive stimuli.

==== Striatum ====
The striatum is a part of the brain that coordinates motivation with body movement. The striatum likely plays a role in attention and reward anticipation, both of which are important in provoking curiosity.

==== Precuneus ====
The precuneus is a region of the brain that is involved in attention, episodic memory, and visuospatial processing. There is a correlation between the amount of grey matter in the precuneus and levels of curious and exploratory behaviors. This suggests that precuneus density has an influence on levels of curiosity.

=== Memory and learning ===
Memory plays an important role in curiosity. Memory is how the brain stores and accesses stored information. If curiosity is the desire to seek out and understand unfamiliar or novel stimuli, memory helps determine if the stimulus is indeed unfamiliar. In order to determine if a stimulus is novel, an individual must remember if the stimulus has been encountered before.

Curiosity may also affect memory. Stimuli that are novel tend to capture more of our attention. Additionally, novel stimuli usually have a reward value associated with them, the anticipated reward of what learning that new information may bring. With stronger associations and more attention devoted to a stimulus, it is probable that the memory formed from that stimulus will be longer lasting and easier to recall, both of which facilitate better learning.

==== Hippocampus and the parahippocampal gyrus ====
The hippocampus is important in memory formation and recall and therefore in determining the novelty of various stimuli. Research suggests the hippocampus is involved in generating the motivation to explore for the purpose of learning.

The parahippocampal gyrus (PHG), an area of grey matter surrounding the hippocampus, has been implicated in the amplification of curiosity.

==== Amygdala ====
The amygdala is associated with emotional processing, particularly for the emotion of fear, as well as memory. It is important in processing emotional reactions towards novel or unexpected stimuli and the induction of exploratory behavior. This suggests a connection between curiosity levels and the amygdala. However, more research is needed on direct correlation.

== Early development ==
Jean Piaget argued that babies and children constantly try to make sense of their reality and that this contributes to their intellectual development. According to Piaget, children develop hypotheses, conduct experiments, and then reassess their hypotheses depending on what they observe. Piaget was the first to closely document children's actions and interpret them as consistent, calculated efforts to test and learn about their environment.

There is no universally accepted definition for curiosity in children. Most research on curiosity focused on adults and used self-report measures that are inappropriate and inapplicable for studying children.

Exploratory behaviour is commonly observed in children and is associated with their curiosity development. Several studies of children's curiosity simply observe their interaction with novel and familiar toys.

Evidence suggests a relationship between the anxiety children might feel and their curiosity. One study found that object curiosity in 11-year-olds was negatively related to psychological maladjusted so children who exhibit more anxiety in classroom settings engage in less curious behaviour. Certain aspects of classroom learning may depend on curiosity, which can be affected by students' anxiety.

An aptitude for curiosity in adolescents may produce higher academic performance. One study revealed that, of 568 high school students, those who exhibited an aptitude for curiosity, in conjunction with motivation and creativity, showed a 33.1% variation in math scores and 15.5% variation in science scores when tested on a standardized academic exam.

Other measures of childhood curiosity used exploratory behaviour as a basis but differed on which parts of this behaviour to focus on. Some studies examined children's preference for complexity/the unknown as a basis for their curiosity measure; others relied on novelty preference as their basis.

Researchers also examined the relationship between a child's reaction to surprise and their curiosity. Children may be further motivated to learn when dealing with uncertainty. Their reactions to not having their expectations met may fuel their curiosity more than the introduction of a novel or complex object would.

== Curiosity as a virtue ==
Curiosity has been of interest to philosophers. Curiosity has been recognised as an important intellectual (or "epistemic") virtue, due to the role that it plays in motivating people to acquire knowledge and understanding. It has also been considered an important moral virtue, as curiosity can help humans find meaning in their lives and to cultivate a sense of care about others and things in the world. When curiosity in young people leads to knowledge-gathering it is widely seen as a positive.

Due to the importance of curiosity, people debate about whether contemporary societies effectively cultivate the right type of curiosity.

Some believe that children's curiosity is discouraged throughout the process of formal education: "Children are born scientists. From the first ball they send flying to the ant they watch carry a crumb, children use science's tools—enthusiasm, hypotheses, tests, conclusions—to uncover the world's mysteries. But somehow students seem to lose what once came naturally."

== Impact from disease ==
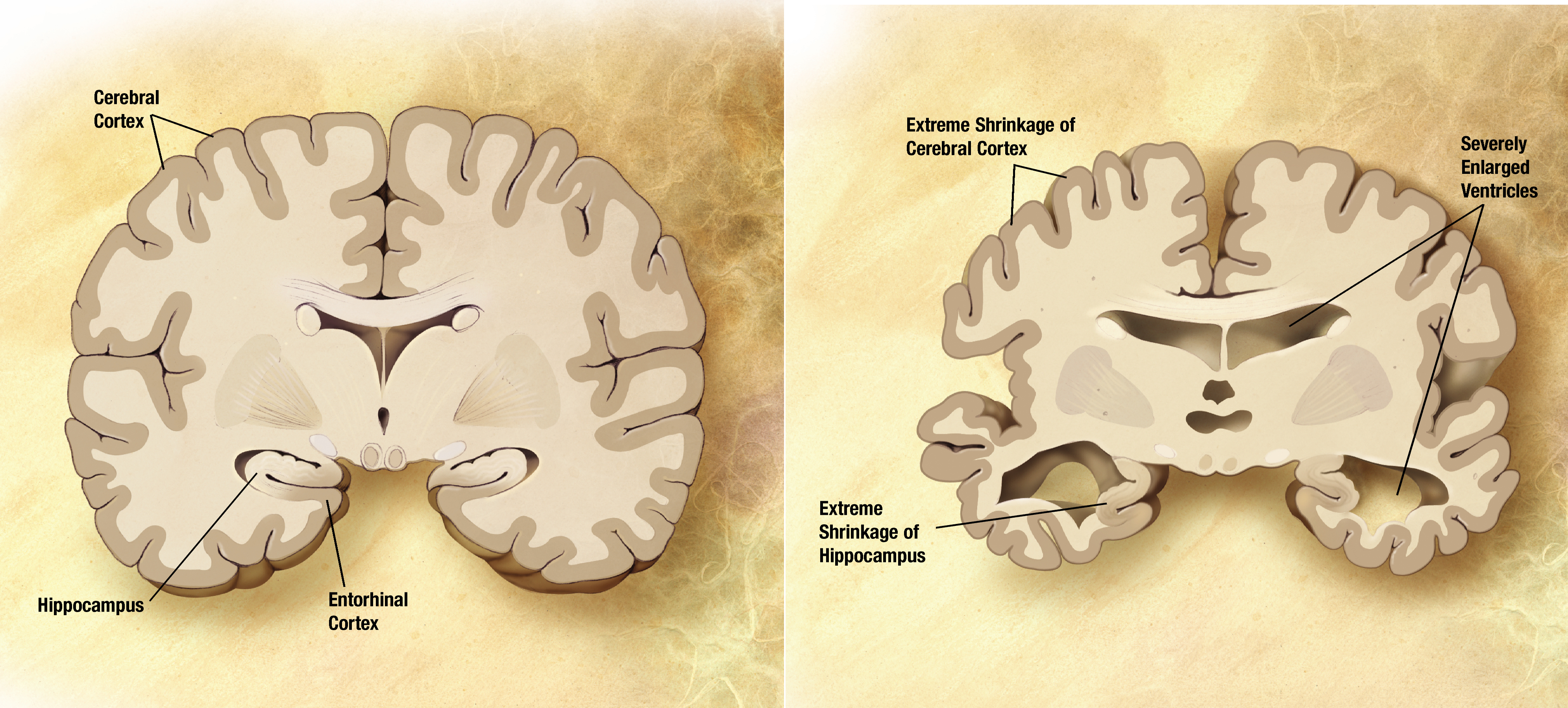
Left: normal brain. Right: Alzheimer's disease afflicted brain. Severe degeneration of areas implicated in curiosity

Neurodegenerative diseases and psychological disorders can affect various characteristics of curiosity. For example how Alzheimer's disease's effects memory or depression affects motivation and reward. Alzheimer's is a neurodegenerative disease that degrades memory. Depression is a mood disorder that is characterized by a lack of interest in one's environment and feelings of sadness or hopelessness. A lack of curiosity for novel stimuli might be a predictor for these and other illnesses.

== Social curiosity ==
Social curiosity is defined as a drive to understand one's environment as it relates to sociality with others. Such curiosity plays a role in one's ability to successfully navigate social interactions by perceiving and processing one's own behavior and the behavior of others. It also plays a role in helping one adapt to varying social situations.

== Morbid curiosity ==
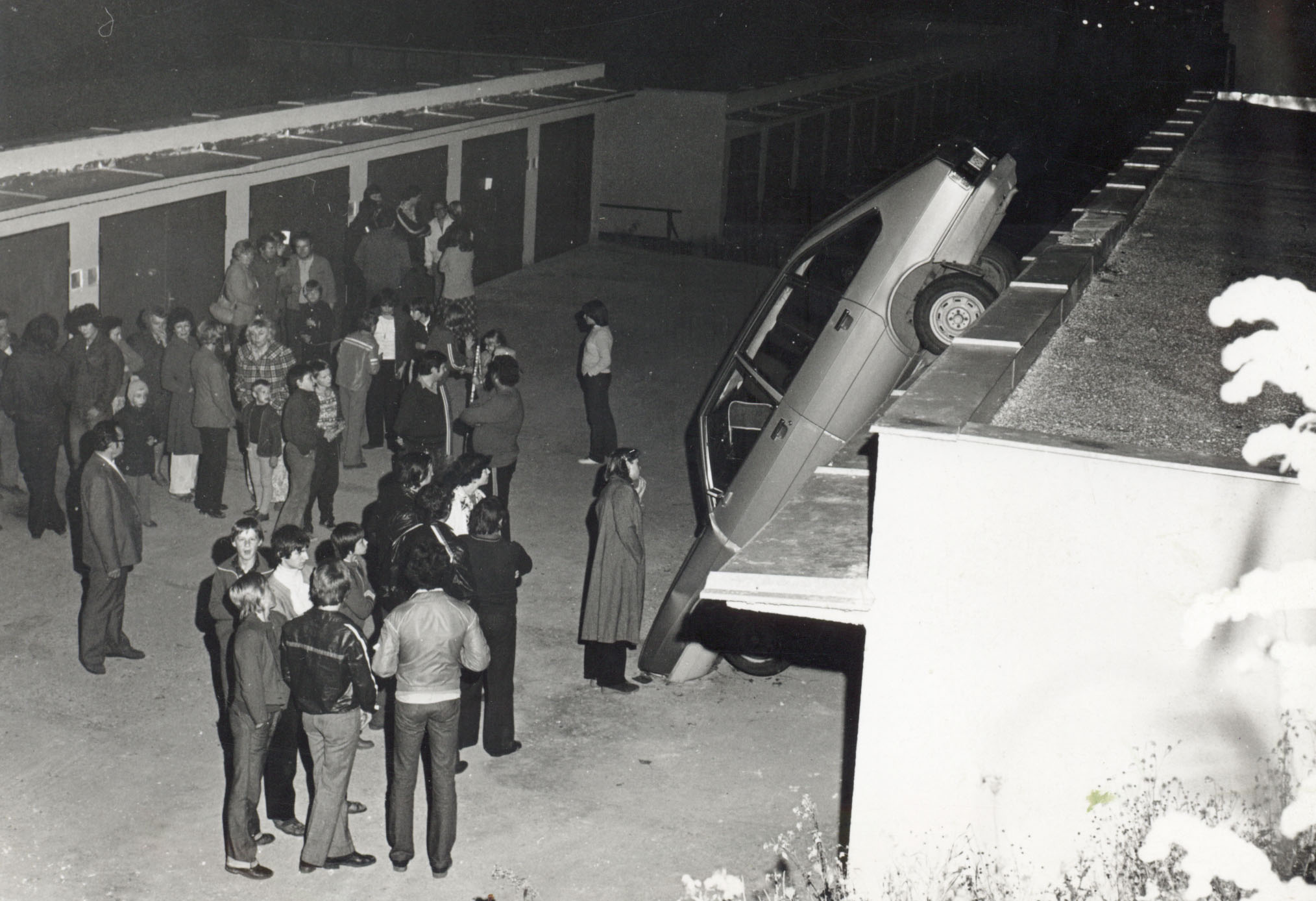
A crowd mills around the site of a car accident in Czechoslovakia in 1980.

Morbid curiosity is focused on death, violence, or any other event that may cause harm physically or emotionally. It typically is described as having an addictive quality, associated with a need to understand or make sense of topics that surround harm, violence, or death. This can be attributed to one's need to relate unusual and often difficult circumstances to a primary emotion or experience of one's own, described as meta-emotions.

One explanation evolutionary biologists offer for curiosity about death is that by learning about life-threatening situations, death can be avoided. Another suggestion some psychologists posit is that as spectators of gruesome events, humans are seeking to empathize with the victim. Alternatively, people may be trying to understand how another person can become the perpetrator of harm. According to science journalist Erika Engelhaupt, morbid curiosity is not "a desire to be sad", instead it "has the ability to set our minds ... at ease by reassuring us that even death follows the rules of the natural world".

Interest in human curiosity about difficult circumstances dates back to Aristotle in his Poetics, in which he noted, "We enjoy and admire paintings of objects that in themselves would annoy or disgust us." A 2017 paper in the journal PLOS One concluded that people choose to see graphic images even when presented the option to avoid them and look at them for a longer period of time than neutral or positive images.

== State and trait curiosity ==
Curiosity can be a temporary state of being, or a stable trait in an individual. State curiosity is external—wondering why things happen just for the sake of curiousness, for example wondering why most stores open at 8 a.m. Trait curiosity describes people who are interested in learning, for example by trying out a new sport or food, or traveling to an unfamiliar place. One can look at curiosity as the urge that draws people out of their comfort zones and fears as the agents that keep them within those zones.

== Curiosity in artificial intelligence ==
AI agents can exhibit curiosity through intrinsic motivation. This can improve the success of an AI agent at various tasks. In artificial intelligence, curiosity is typically defined quantitatively, as the uncertainty the agent has in predicting its own actions given its current state.

In 2019, a study trained AI agents to play video games, but they were rewarded only for curiosity. The agents reliably learned advantageous game behaviors based solely on the curiosity reward.

== Curiosity mementos ==
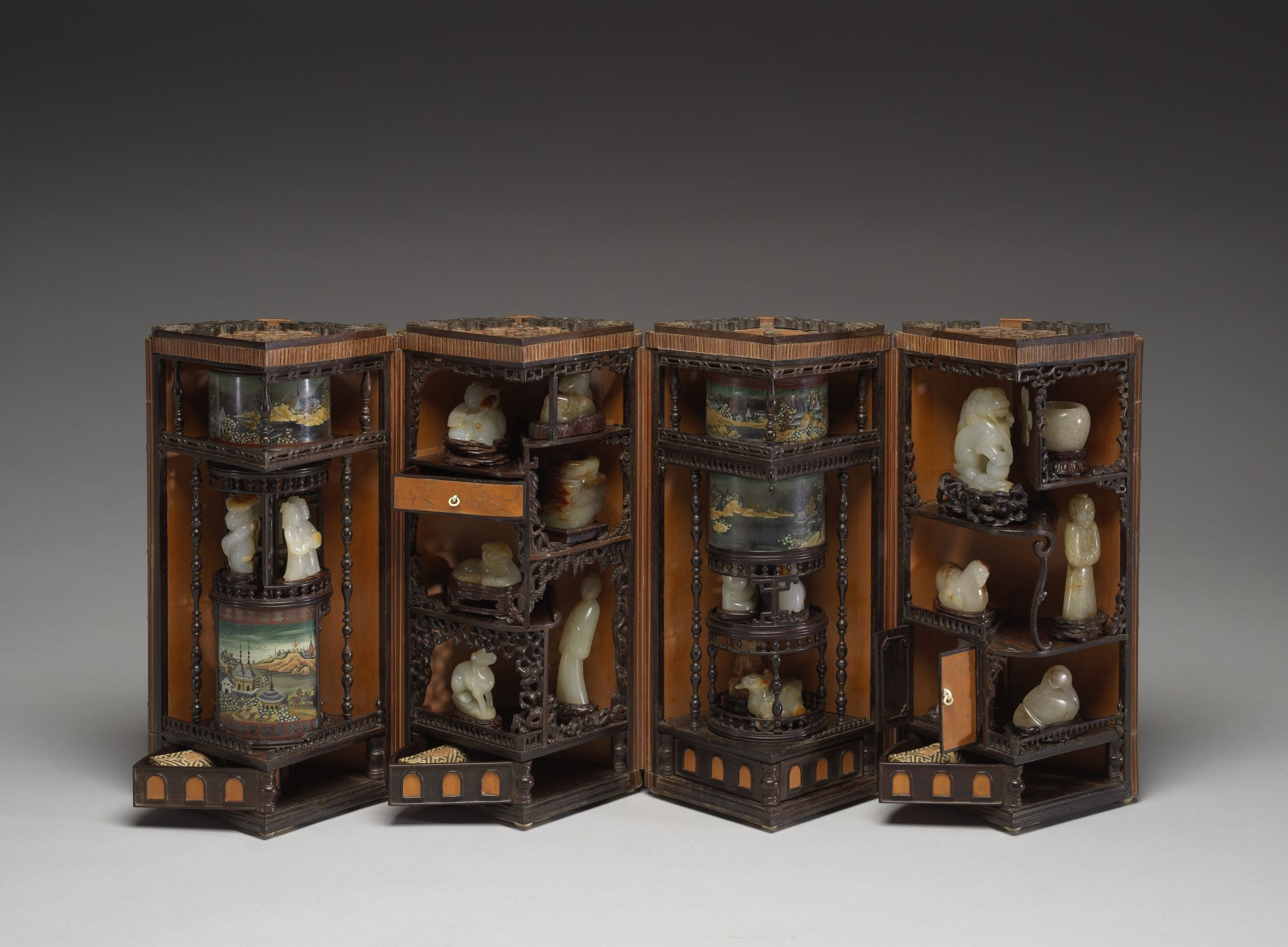
Red sandalwood curio box with bamboo-veneered decoration. Qianlong era (1736-1795). National Palace Museum 故雜001284N000000000

People will designate things as a 'curiosity' to share their interest with others.

A collection may be stored in an anthology, curiosities cabinet, museum, or some other way to display curios. The following quote is from an antiquarian's anthology of what he found curious:

An antiquary lights on many a curiosity whilst overhauling the dusty tomes of ancient writers. This little book is a small museum in which I have preserved some of the quaintest relics which have attracted my notice during my labours. The majority of the articles were published in 1869. I have now added some others.

Lew Trenchard,

September 1895.

— Sabine Baring-Gould, CURIOSITIES OF OLDEN TIMES (full text on Wikisource), Preface

== See also ==
- Blue skies research – Curiosity-driven scientific research, without a clear practical goal
- Broaden-and-build – Theory of positive emotions
- Interest (emotion) – Feeling that causes attention to focus on an object, event or process
- Inquiry – Type of investigation
- Play (activity) – Voluntary, intrinsically motivated recreation
