= Ethics of belief =

The ethics of belief refers to a cluster of related issues that focus on standards of rational belief, intellectual excellence, and conscientious belief-formation. Among the questions addressed in the field are:

- Are there standards of some sort ("epistemic norms") that ought to guide how we form beliefs and pursue intellectual aims, such as the pursuit of truth or the quest for understanding?
- If so, what kind of norms? Moral? Purely intellectual? Prudential?
- If there are such norms, how strong are they? Are they categorical (i.e., binding regardless of our desires and commitments) or merely hypothetical (applicable only if we have certain desires and goals?) Do they bind absolutely or only conditionally?
- Are beliefs within our voluntary control, or do we more or less automatically believe whatever we think is best supported by the evidence?
- What aims should we have as believers? Achieving significant truth? Avoiding significant error? Achieving knowledge? Pleasure? Peace of mind? Understanding? Wisdom?
- Must one always have sufficient evidence for one's beliefs (a view philosophers call "evidentialism"), or is it sometimes permissible to believe without sufficient evidence—or perhaps without any evidence at all?
- What sorts of "intellectual virtues" (admirable mental traits, skills, and habits) are necessary for intellectual excellence and high-quality critical thinking?

== Origins of the debate: Clifford vs. James ==
Contemporary discussions of the ethics of belief stem largely from a famous nineteenth-century exchange between the British mathematician and philosopher W. K. Clifford and the American philosopher William James. In 1877 Clifford published an article titled "The Ethics of Belief" in the journal The Contemporary Review. There Clifford argued for a strict form of evidentialism that he summed up in a famous dictum: "It is wrong always, everywhere, and for anyone to believe anything on insufficient evidence." As Clifford saw it, people have intellectual as well as moral duties, and both are extremely demanding. People who base their beliefs on wishful thinking, self-interest, blind faith, or other such unreliable grounds are not merely intellectually slovenly; they are immoral. Such bad intellectual habits harm both themselves and society. We sin grievously against our moral and intellectual duty when we form beliefs on insufficient evidence, or ignore or dismiss evidence that is relevant to our beliefs.

Clifford's article provoked a spirited reply from the Harvard philosopher and psychologist William James. In his 1896 paper "The Will to Believe", James argued that there are times when it is permissible, or even obligatory, to form a belief even though we lack sufficient evidence for it. One sort of example he cites is "precursive faith", when belief runs ahead of the evidence but is essential for success (e.g., borderline-excessive self-confidence in an athlete). James made it clear that he did not endorse wishful thinking. He set forth strict conditions for when it was permissible to believe without intellectually adequate evidence. Specifically, James laid down that:

1. there must be no compelling evidence one way or another (i.e., the issue is "intellectually undecidable")
2. both options must be "live hypotheses" for the relevant chooser (i.e., the chooser could sincerely believe either option)
3. the choice must be "forced" in the sense that one of two options must definitely be chosen, and refusing to choose is tantamount to making one of the two choices
4. the choice must be "momentous" (i.e., deeply important or significant to the chooser)

Famously, James argued that for many people the decision whether or not to believe in God satisfies these four conditions. Such people, James claims, have both an intellectual and a moral right to believe in God, even though by their own admission they lack sufficient evidence to justify this choice.

== Earlier work on the ethics of belief ==
Many thinkers before Clifford and James had important things to say about the ethics of belief. In ancient Greece, Socrates stressed the importance of self-examination, the pursuit of wisdom, and admitting how little one knows. Ancient skeptics such as Pyrrho, Arcesilaus, and Sextus Empiricus argued that we should suspend judgment on most controversial matters because powerful and perhaps equally compelling arguments can always be given on both sides. In modern times, René Descartes wrote extensively on norms of intellectual inquiry in his Discourse on Method (1637), as did John Locke in Book 4 of his Essay Concerning Human Understanding (1690). Three important thinkers—Blaise Pascal, Immanuel Kant, and Søren Kierkegaard—anticipated James in rejecting evidentialism and arguing that there are important matters on which, for practical or existential grounds, we should believe even if we lack sufficient evidence.

== Epistemic norms ==
Rules or standards that properly govern responsible belief-formation and the pursuit of intellectual excellence are what philosophers call epistemic (or "doxastic") norms. Widely accepted epistemic norms include:

- Don't believe on insufficient evidence.
- Proportion your beliefs to the strength of the evidence.
- Don't ignore or dismiss relevant evidence.
- Be willing to revise your beliefs in light of new evidence.
- Avoid wishful thinking.
- Be open-minded and fair-minded.
- Be wary of beliefs that align with your self-interest.
- Admit how little you know.
- Be alert to egocentrism, prejudice, and other mental biases.
- Be careful to draw logical conclusions.
- Base your beliefs on credible, well-substantiated evidence.
- Be consistent.
- Be curious and passionate in the pursuit of knowledge.
- Think clearly and precisely.
- Carefully investigate claims that concern you.
- Actively seek out views that differ from your own.
- Be grateful for constructive criticisms.
- Question your assumptions.
- Think about the implications of your beliefs.
- Persevere through boring or difficult intellectual tasks.
- Be thorough in your intellectual work.
- Stick up for your beliefs, even in the face of peer pressure, ridicule, or intolerance.

== See also ==
- Epistemic virtue
- Intellectual responsibility
