= Gilles Gignac =

Canadian research psychologist

Gilles E. Gignac
- Born: Ontario, Canada
- Education: Laurentian University (B.A. with honours, 1999); University of Western Ontario (M.A., 2001); Swinburne University of Technology (Ph.D., 2005)
- Known for: Intelligence research
- Awards: Ig Nobel Prize, 2025
- Scientific career
- Fields: Psychology
- Workplaces: University of Western Australia
- Thesis: Determining the dimensionality of a self-report emotional intelligence inventory (SUEIT) and testing its unique factorial validity (2005)

Gilles E. Gignac is a research psychologist from Ontario, Canada currently serving as an associate professor in psychology at the University of Western Australia. He is known for his research on human intelligence and differential psychology. He received an Ig Nobel Prize in 2025 for "investigating what happens when you tell narcissists — or anyone else — that they are intelligent" in his 2021 paper, co-authored with Marcin Zajenkowski, "Telling People They Are Intelligent Correlates with the Feeling of Narcissistic Uniqueness: The Influence of IQ Feedback on Temporary State Narcissism".
