= Wishful thinking =

Formation of beliefs based on what might be pleasing to imagine

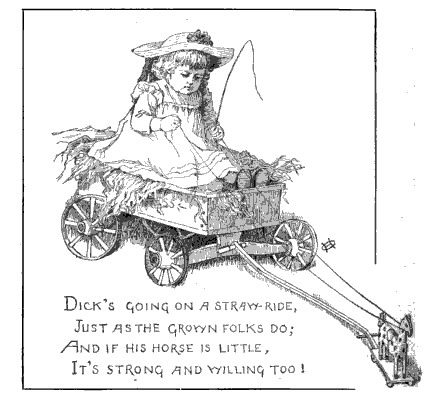
Illustration from St. Nicholas: an Illustrated Magazine for Young Folks (1884) of a child imagining that a small, toy horse might pull his cart

Wishful thinking is the formation of beliefs based on what might be pleasing to imagine, rather than on evidence, rationality, or reality. It is a product of resolving conflicts between belief and desire. Methodologies to examine wishful thinking are diverse. Various disciplines and schools of thought examine related mechanisms such as neural circuitry, human cognition and emotion, types of bias, procrastination, motivation, optimism, attention and environment. This concept has been examined as a fallacy. It is related to the concept of wishful seeing.

Some psychologists believe that positive thinking is able to positively influence behavior and so bring about better results. This is called the "Pygmalion effect". Studies have consistently shown that holding all else equal, subjects will have unrealistic optimism and predict positive outcomes to be more likely than negative outcomes. Research also suggests that under certain circumstances, such as when threat increases, a reverse phenomenon occurs.

== As a fallacy ==
In addition to being a cognitive bias and a poor way of making decisions, wishful thinking is commonly held to be a specific informal fallacy in an argument when it is assumed that, because one wishes something to be true or false, it is actually true or false. This fallacy has the form "I wish that P were true/false; therefore, P is true/false." Wishful thinking, if this were true, would rely upon appeals to emotion, and would also be a red herring.

Wishful thinking may cause blindness to unintended consequences.

== Wishful seeing ==
Wishful seeing is the phenomenon in which a person's internal state influences their visual perception. People have the tendency to believe that they perceive the world for what it is, but research suggests otherwise. Currently, there are two main types of wishful seeing based on where wishful seeing occurs—in categorization of objects or in representations of an environment.

The concept of wishful seeing was first introduced by the New Look approach to psychology. The New Look approach was popularized in the 1950s through the work of Jerome Bruner and Cecile Goodman. In their classic 1947 study, they asked children to demonstrate their perception of the size of coins by manipulating the diameter of a circular aperture on a wooden box. Each child held the coin in their left hand at the same height and distance from the aperture and operated the knob to change the size of the aperture with their right hand. The children were divided into three groups, two experimental and one control, with ten children in each group. The control group was asked to estimate the size of coin-sized cardboard discs instead of actual coins. On average, the children of the experimental groups overestimated the size of the coins by thirty percent. In a second iteration of the experiment, Bruner and Goodman divided the children into groups based on economic status. Again, both the "poor" and "rich" groups were asked to estimate the size of real coins by manipulating the diameter of the aperture. As was expected, both groups overestimated the size of the coins, but the "poor" group overestimated the size by as much as fifty percent, which was up to thirty percent more than the "rich" group. From these results Bruner and Goodman concluded that poorer children felt a greater desire for money and thus perceived the coins as larger. This hypothesis formed the basis of the New Look psychological approach which suggests that the subjective experience of an object influences the visual perception of that object. Some psychodynamic psychologists adopted the views of the New Look approach in order to explain how individuals might protect themselves from disturbing visual stimuli. The psychodynamic perspective lost support because it lacked a sufficient model to account for how the unconscious could influence perception.

Although some further research was able to replicate the results found by Bruner and Goodman, the New Look approach was mostly abandoned by the 1970s because the experiments were riddled with methodological errors that did not account for confounding factors such as reporter bias and context. Recent research has brought about a revival of New Look perspectives, but with methodological improvements to resolve the outstanding issues that plagued the original studies.

== Reverse wishful thinking and seeing ==
This process occurs when threat increases. The Ebbinghaus illusion has been used to measure reverse wishful seeing, with participants observing negative flanker targets underestimated less than positive or neutral targets. Feelings of fear also lead to perception of the feared object as closer just as prior research suggests that desired objects are perceived as closer. Furthermore, some people are less inclined to wishful thinking/seeing based on their emotional states or personality.

== Underlying mechanisms ==
=== Cognition ===
Concrete cognitive mechanisms underlying wishful thinking and wishful seeing are unknown. Since these concepts are still developing, research on the mechanisms contributing to this phenomenon is still in progress. However, some mechanisms have been proposed. Wishful thinking could be attributed to three mechanisms: attentional bias, interpretation bias or response bias. Therefore, there are three different stages in cognitive processing in which wishful thinking could arise. First, at the lowest stage of cognitive processing, individuals selectively attend to cues. Individuals can attend to evidence that supports their desires and neglect contradictory evidence. Second, wishful thinking could be generated by selective interpretation of cues. In this case, an individual is not changing their attention to the cue but the attribution of importance to the cue. Finally, wishful thinking can arise at a higher stage of cognitive processing, such as when forming a response to the cue and inserting bias.

Wishful seeing can be attributed to the same mechanisms as wishful thinking because it involves the processing of situational cues, including visual cues. However, with preconscious processing of visual cues and their associations with desirable outcomes, interpretation bias and response bias are not plausible since they occur in conscious cognitive processing stages. Therefore, a fourth mechanism called perceptual set can also explain this phenomenon. This mechanism proposes that mental states or associations activated before an object comes into view subtly guide the visual system during processing. Therefore, cues are readily recognized when they are related to such a mental state or association.

Some speculate that wishful seeing results from cognitive penetrability in that higher cognitive functions are able to directly influence perceptual experience instead of only influencing perception at higher levels of processing. Those that argue against cognitive penetrability feel that sensory systems operate in a modular fashion with cognitive states exerting their influence only after the stimuli has been perceived. The phenomenon of wishful seeing implicates cognitive penetrability in the perceptual experience.

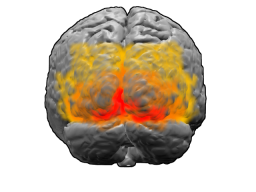
The extrastriate cortex (shown in orange and red) is believed to be involved in perceptual priming.

Wishful seeing has been observed to occur in early stages of categorization. Research using ambiguous figures and binocular rivalry exhibit this tendency. Perception is influenced by both top-down and bottom-up processing. In visual processing, bottom-up processing is a rigid route compared to flexible top-down processing. Within bottom-up processing, the stimuli are recognized by fixation points, proximity and focal areas to build objects, while top-down processing is more context sensitive. This effect can be observed via priming as well as with emotional states. The traditional hierarchical models of information processing describe early visual processing as a one-way street: early visual processing goes into conceptual systems, but conceptual systems do not affect visual processes. Currently, research rejects this model and suggests conceptual information can penetrate early visual processing rather than just biasing the perceptual systems. This occurrence is called conceptual or cognitive penetrability. Research on conceptual penetrability utilize stimuli of conceptual-category pairs and measure the reaction time to determine if the category effect influenced visual processing, The category effect is the difference in reaction times within the pairs such as Bb to Bp. To test conceptual penetrability, there were simultaneous and sequential judgments of pairs. The reaction times decreased as the stimulus onset asynchrony increased, supporting categories affect visual representations and conceptual penetrability. Research with richer stimuli such as figures of cats and dogs allow for greater perceptual variability and analysis of stimulus typicality (cats and dogs were arranged in various positions, some more or less typical for recognition). Differentiating the pictures took longer when they were within the same category (dog_{a}-dog_{b}) compared between categories (dog-cat) supporting category knowledge influences categorization. Therefore, visual processing measured by physical differential judgments is affected by non-visual processing supporting conceptual penetrability.

=== Neural circuitry ===
The areas of the brain that motivate wishful seeing and thinking are associated with the same regions that underlie social identification and reward. A study looked at these structures using MRI while participants estimated the winning probabilities for a series of football teams. Prior to this estimation, the individuals specified their favorite, neutral and least favorite NFL teams. Wishful thinking has been associated with social identity theory where individuals seem to prefer in-group members over out-group members. In this case, these individuals preferred the football team they most identified.

During wishful thinking tasks, differential activity was found in three areas of the brain: dorsal medial prefrontal cortex, the parietal lobe, and the fusiform gyrus in the occipital lobe. Differential activity in the occipital and parietal areas suggests a mode of selective attention to the cues presented; therefore, supporting a lower-level cognitive processing or attention bias. However, differential activity in the prefrontal cortex also suggests higher-cognitive processing. The prefrontal cortex activity is related to preferences involved in social identification. As a result, when cues are relevant to an individual, such as a favorite football team, the prefrontal cortex is activated. This identification of self carries hedonic value which in turn stimulates the reward system. Differential activation of the reward system areas was only seen in conjunction with the activation of occipital lobe. Thus, the activation of the reward system with an identification of self could lead to guidance of visual attention.

Magnocellular (M) and parvocellular (P) pathways, which feed into the orbitofrontal cortex, play important roles in top-down processes that are susceptible to cognitive penetrability. Magnocellular processing biased stimuli deferentially activates the orbitofrontal cortex; fast magnocellular projections link early visual and inferotemporal object recognition and work with the orbitofrontal cortex by helping generate early object predictions based on perceptual sets. Stimuli were M-biased with low-luminance, achromatic line drawings or P-biased with isoluminate, chromatic line drawings and participants were asked if the drawing was larger or smaller than a shoebox. Functional magnetic resonance imaging was used to monitor brain activity in the orbitofrontal cortex and ventrotemporal regions to determine which pathway aided faster object recognition. The results supported that magnocellular neurons play a vital role in low-resolution object recognition as the neurons aid in quickly triggering top-down processes that provide initial guesses that lead to faster object recognition.

== Attention ==
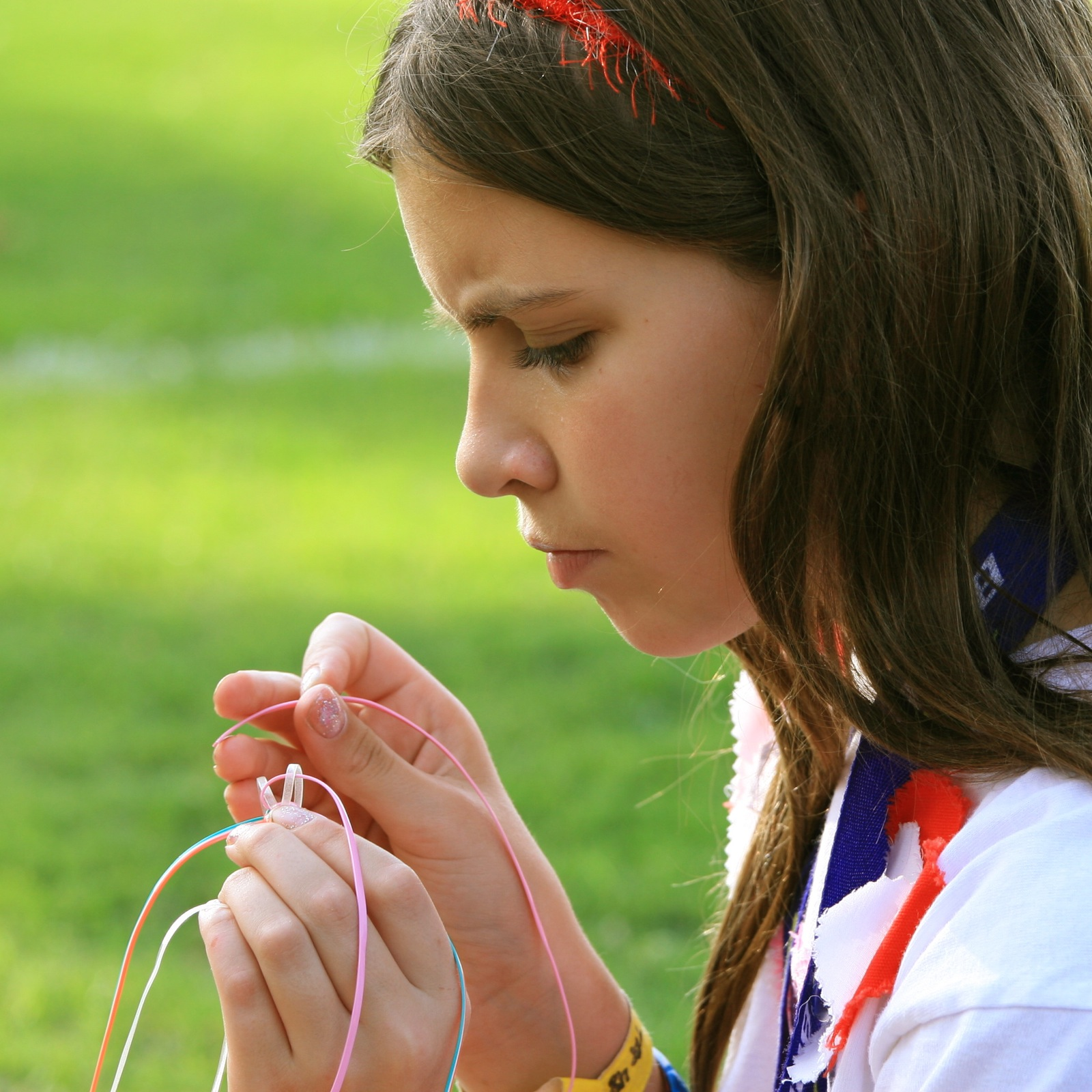
Focused attention

Humans have a physiologically limited visual field that must be selectively directed to certain stimuli. Attention is the cognitive process that allows this task to be accomplished and it might be responsible for the phenomenon of wishful seeing. Expectations, desires and fears are among the various factors that help direct attention. Consequently, these cognitive experiences have the opportunity to influence the perceptual experience. In turn, attention can organize planned movement, providing a mechanism through which visual stimuli can influence behavior.

Attentional deficits can also lead to altered perceptual experiences. Inattentional blindness, where unexpected events go by undetected, is one such deficit. Using an inattentional blindness paradigm, researchers, White and Davies, had participants fixate on a cross in the center of the screen. First, a number cue denoting the number of letters that would appear on the arms of the cross appeared in the center of the cross. Following the cue, the actual letters would appear on the arms of the cross. Over four trials, the number of letters matched the number that was cued. On the fifth trial, half of the participants were cued to expect a smaller number of letters and half were cued to expect the correct number of letters. The letters then appeared on the screen accompanied by an unexpected stimulus. Participants were asked which letters appeared and whether they had seen any additional object. Participants cued to expect fewer letters were more susceptible to inattentional blindness as they failed to detect the unexpected stimulus more often than participants who had been cued to expect the correct number of stimuli. These results indicate that attentional capacity is affected by expectations. This provides further evidence that cognitive processes converge in order to help construct the perceptual experience.

Although attention can lead to enhanced perceptual processing, the lack of attention to stimuli can also lead to a perceived enhanced perception of the stimuli. Participants were pre-cued that indicated the diagonal to which they should be attending. They were then presented with stimuli (gratings with different textures) and then a response cue that indicated the diagonal for which the participants had to judge their perception. 70% of the time the response cue matched the pre-cue and 30% of the time did not match the pre-cue. The participants were asked to report the texture of the gratings that appeared in the response-cue and discriminate its visibility. This set-up allowed them to compare the perception of attended (cued) and non-attended stimuli (uncued). Higher visibility was reported for stimuli that was unattended. Therefore, inattention lead to an overestimation of perception sensitivity. This study suggests attention bias, a mechanism of wishful thinking, does not only rely on what individuals fixate upon, but the unattended stimuli as well.

=== Interpretation of emotion ===
Emotion is often interpreted through visual cues on the face, body language and context. However, context and cultural backgrounds have been shown to influence the visual perception and interpretation of emotion. Cross-cultural differences in change blindness have been associated with perceptual set, or a tendency to attend to visual scenes in a particular way. For example, eastern cultures tend to emphasize the background of an object, while western cultures focus on the central objects in a scene. Perceptual sets are also the result of cultural aesthetic preferences. Therefore, cultural context can influence how people sample information from a face, just like they would do in a situational context. For example, Caucasians generally fixate around eyes, nose and mouth, while Asians fixate on eyes. Individuals from different cultural backgrounds who were shown a series of faces and asked to sort them into piles in which every face showed the same emotion. Fixation on different features of the face leads to disparate reading of emotions. Asians' focus on the eyes lead to the perception of startled faces as surprise rather than fear. As a result, previous associations or customs of an individual can lead to different categorization or recognition of emotion. This particular difference in visual perception of emotion seems to suggest an attention bias mechanism for wishful seeing, since certain visual cues were attended to (e.g. nose, eyes) and the others were ignored (e.g. mouth).

=== Optimism ===
Wishful seeing is also linked to optimism bias through which individuals tend to expect positive outcomes from events despite such expectations having little basis in reality. In order to determine the neural correlates underlying optimism bias, one functional magnetic resonance imaging (fMRI) study imaged the brains of individuals as they recalled autobiographical moments related to life events and then rated their memories on several scales. These ratings revealed that participants viewed future positive events as more positive than past positive events and negative events as more temporally distant. The active brain regions, compared to a fixation point, were the rostral anterior cingulate cortex (rACC) and the right amygdala. Both of these areas became less active when imagining negative future events. The rACC is implicated in assessing emotional content and has strong connections to the amygdala. It is suggested that the rACC regulates activation in brain regions associated with emotion and autobiographical memory, thus allowing for the projection of positivity onto images of future events.

It is important to consider physical aspects such as eye movement and brain activity and their relationship to wishful thinking, wishful seeing, and optimism. Isaacowitz (2006) investigated the motivational role of gaze, which he claims is highly correlated to an individual's interests and personality. In his study, participants who embodied varying levels of self-reported optimism were directed to look at images of skin cancer, line drawings that were similar to the cancer pictures, and neutral faces. Using a remote eye tracking system that measured the movement of the participants gaze, Isaacowitz found that more optimistically minded young adults gazed less on the skin cancer images when compared to the less optimistically minded participants. This data was replicated in a follow-up study in which participants were screened for their genetically based risk for contracting skin cancer (even though some participants were more at risk than others, higher levels of optimism were correlated with a less fixated gaze on the skin cancer images despite the fact that the images were relevant to some participants).

== Methodology ==
Wishful thinking is often studied in the context of psychology through the application of ambiguous figure studies, the hypothesis being that when presented with an ambiguous stimuli, the participant will interpret the stimuli in a certain way depending on the conditions or priming the participant experiences.

Balcetis and Dunning (2013) investigated wishful seeing by conducting two experiments, one involving two ambiguous stimuli that could be perceived as "B" or "13", and the other either a horse or a seal. The second experiment was a binocular rivalry test in which the participants were presented simultaneously with the letter "H" or number "4" (one stimuli in each eye). In each experiment, the experimenters associated one of the stimuli with desirable outcomes, and the other with a negative outcome (i.e. the "B" was associated with freshly squeezed orange juice while the "13" was associated with an undesirable health food smoothie, and in the binocular rivalry experiment, letters were associated with economic gain while numbers were associated with economic loss). The results of the experiment demonstrated that participants were more likely to perceive the stimulus that was associated with a positive situation or outcome than the stimulus associated with negative situations. This strong correlation between perception and positive versus negative stimuli demonstrates that we tend to see the world based on our own desires. The concept of wishful seeing hints towards a motivation-based perception process.

Balcetis and Dale (2007) further considered that we view the world in biased ways in their four-prong study, one part of which addressed motivated object interpretation using a situation involving the interpretation of an ambiguous object (i.e. a Necker cube) that lacks the language based labels that the priming information may suggest to the participants. Many studies claim that what humans perceive or see is based on our internal motivation and goals, but it is important to consider that some priming situations in certain studies, or even the internal views of the participant, can affect the interpretation of a stimulus. With these considerations in mind, Balcetis and Dale (2007), divided 124 Cornell University undergraduates into three groups which were each asked to imagine one of three detailed conditions: an upward-looking condition (participants were asked to imagine looking up at a large building), a downward-looking position (looking into a deep canyon), and a neutral/flat condition (standing in a flat field). The participants were then shown an ambiguous Necker cube on a computer screen and were told to click one of the two blue lines that seemed the closest to them. The line the participants chose depended on whether they determined the cube to be facing upwards or downwards. The results of the study demonstrated that the majority of participants in the upward-looking condition saw the cube as facing upwards, the majority of downwards-looking conditioned patients saw the cube as facing downwards, and the participants in the neutral condition were evenly divided. These results show that the priming stimulus language influenced object identification. Motivation-affected object identification was observed in each condition.

Similar results were seen in a study conducted by Changizi and Hall (2001), which addressed wishful thinking and goal-oriented object identification by investigating levels of thirst among participants in relation to their tendency to identify an ambiguously transparent stimulus as transparent (the study states that transparency is a natural yet unobvious quality directly related to water, a typically clear substance). The results of the study showed a clear tendency for the thirsty participants (who were directed to eat a bag of potato chips immediately preceding the study) to interpret the ambiguous stimuli as transparent. Furthermore, the participants who were not thirsty (they were directed to drink water before the study until they reported themselves as not thirsty) were less likely to interpret the ambiguous stimuli as transparent. The study concludes that an alteration of a biological state, in this case the participants' level of thirstiness, that inspires wishful thinking, can directly affect the perception of visual stimuli.

Bastardi, Uhlmann, and Ross (2011), showed the effects of wishful thinking when they presented parents with two fictional studies involving day care versus home care for their children. The parents who were conflicted (planned to use day care despite believing home care to be superior) more positively rated the "study" that claimed day care as superior and more negatively rated the study that claimed home care was better. The unconflicted parents (those that thought home care was superior to day care and planned to use only home care) rated the study that claimed home care was better more positively. The parents rated the studies that claimed what they actually planned for their children was the superior action, even though (in the case of the conflicted parents) the study may have been in opposition to their original beliefs. In a post-experiment evaluation, the conflicted parents changed their initial beliefs and claimed to believe that home care was no better than day care, and the unconflicted parents continued to claim home care to be superior, though to a lesser degree.

Balcetis and Dunning (2012) used the natural ambiguity found in judging distances to measure the effects of wishful seeing. During the study participants judged the distance to various stimuli while the experimenters manipulated the desirability of the stimuli. In one study, participants had their thirst intensified by consuming a large portion of their daily sodium intake or quenched by drinking to satiety. They were then asked to estimate the distance to a bottle of water. Those participants who were thirstier ranked the bottle of water as more desirable and viewed it as closer than less thirsty participants. Another study performed by Balcetis and Dunning had participants estimate the distance to test results that contained either positive or negative feedback and to $100 gift cards that they had the possibility of either winning or not. Participants viewed the forms as closer when they contained positive feedback and the $100 gift cards as closer when there was a possibility that they might win them. Balcetis and Dunning took into account the possible influence of positive mood by measuring creativity through a word creation task, and arousal by physiological markers. The experimenters also eliminated reporter bias in one of their studies by having participants throw a beanbag toward a gift card adhered to the floor. Underthrowing the beanbag indicated that the participant perceived the gift card as closer, while overthrowing the beanbag indicated that the participant perceived the gift card as further away. Their results suggest that there is a positivity bias in the perception of distance.

The relationship between distance perception and positivity may be more complicated than originally thought because context can also influence the distortion of perception. In fact, in threatening situations, positivity bias may be put aside to enable an appropriate response. In turn, the perceptual exaggerations brought on by threatening stimuli can be negated by psychosocial resources. Psychosocial resources are defined by the Resources and Perception Model (RPM) as social support, self-worth, self- esteem, self-efficacy, hope, optimism, perceived control and self-disclosure. The participants reported distance measures while the experimenters manipulated the self-worth of the participants through mental imagery exercises, as well as their exposure to threatening (a tarantula) or non-threatening (a cat toy) stimuli. An effect of self-worth was only observed upon exposure to the threatening stimuli, when increased self-worth was correlated with a more realistic estimate of the distance to the threatening stimuli.

=== Representations of environment ===
Another common area in which wishful seeing can be observed is through environmental representations. Many studies have supported that desire or motivations affect estimates of size, distance, speed, length and slope of environments or targets. For example, people will perceive desired objects as closer. Wishful seeing also affects athletes' perception of balls and other equipment. For example, softball players who see the ball as bigger, hit better; tennis players who return better, see the net as lower and the ball as moving slower.

Distance and slope perception is affected by energy levels. Subjects with a heavier load see hills as steeper and distances as farther. Targets placed uphill seem farther away than those on flat ground. Fit people perceive hills as shallower while fatigued runners see hills as steeper. This perception is modulated by what has been coined as "efficient energy expenditure." In other words, perceived increase in effort (a steeper slope) when physically exhausted, might prompt individuals to rest rather than expend more energy.

Distance perception is also affected by cognitive dissonance. Cognitive dissonance was manipulated by high choice groups which were led to believe they chose to wear a Carmen Miranda outfit to walk across campus versus a low choice group which was told they had to wear the outfit. To reduce cognitive dissonance in high choice groups the subjects changed their attitude to match the situation. Thus, they perceived their environment in a less extreme way (shorter distance) than low choice groups. Similar results followed with a perception of slope test, in which participants were in high and low choice groups to push themselves up a slope on skateboard with only their arms. Again, the high choice group perceived the slope as shallower than the low choice in order to reduce cognitive dissonance. Both of these studies suggest that intrapsychic motives play a role in perception of environments in order to encourage the perceiver to engage in behaviors that lead them either to acquire a desired object or be able to complete a desired task.

== Procrastination and motivation ==
Sigall, Kruglanski, and Fyock (2000) found that people who were assessed to be high wishful thinkers were more likely to procrastinate when motivated to do so (by being told that the task they were about to do was unpleasant). When told the task was going to be pleasant, there was little difference in the amount of procrastination, showing that when motivated, wishful thinkers may consider themselves more capable of doing the task in a lesser amount of time, therefore exhibiting wishful thinking and considering themselves more capable than they are, and as a result, put off working on the unpleasant task.

== See also ==
- Appeal to consequences
- Cherry picking (fallacy)
- Choice-supportive bias
- Confirmation bias
- Delusion
- Emotional memory
- Groupthink
- Ideocracy
- Ideology
- Just-world fallacy
- Magical thinking
- Motivated reasoning
- Nirvana fallacy
- Optimism bias
- Perception
- Pollyanna principle
- Psychic equivalence
- Self-deception
- Self-fulfilling prophecy
- Self-serving bias
- Truthiness
- Velleity
