= Accelerated learning framework =

Educational model

Accelerated Learning Framework (ALF) is an education model. It focuses on three key change drivers. ALF "provides a conceptual link between a digitally rich learning-without-limits environment, and student achievement".

== Change drivers ==
The first change driver places pedagogy and the moral imperative in the role of driver. The second is the establishment of technology as a non-threatening element of learning. The third is the creation of the means for students and teachers to learn from one another. The idea of this structure is to minimize judgement so that people can learn.

== History ==
The framework was created at Park Manor School in Elmira, Ontario, Canada, part of the Waterloo Region District School Board, by lead framework developer, Liz Anderson, who was a Grade 6 teacher at the time.

This framework was first released at the Educational Computing Organization of Ontario 2011 conference in Thornhill, Ontario on October 21, 2011, Anderson (Language Arts Teacher, Park Manor School, WRDSB), James Bond (Principal of Park Manor School, WRDSB) and Melanie Jespersen (French Immersion Teacher, Park Manor School, WRDSB), presented PlayBooks – Digitally Rich Learning Without Limits.

The framework appeared in multiple books by Canadian educational researcher, Michael Fullan, including the 2012 book Stratosphere: Integrating Technology, Pedagogy, and Change Knowledge.
