= Literacy narrative =

Nonfiction literary genre

The literacy narrative is a non-fiction genre of personal narrative which focuses on an individual's experiences with language, often including their development as a reader and writer. Typical literacy narratives could be about reading, writing, speaking, or acquiring language. Like many personal narratives, these are mostly written in the first-person past perspective and are based on true events.

== Uses and characteristics ==
=== Writing pedagogy ===
While literacy narratives can be written by any writer at any time, they are commonly used as early assignments in a first-year composition course. Introducing literacy narratives this way allows writers to begin exploring their experiences with literacy in a creative and meaningful way, while also practicing their use and understanding of rhetorical situations and language. In addition, when given as an assignment near the beginning of the semester, the literacy narrative serves as a way for the writer to introduce themselves to the class.

A literacy narrative is more than a list of how a writer acquired literacy; there must be a story. Similarly to other narratives, a literacy narrative generally follows a pattern of exposition, rising action, conflict, climax, falling action, and conclusion. Typically, literacy narratives will involve a specific literacy challenge that a writer had to overcome, such as public speaking, writing with Dyslexia, or dealing with procrastination. Through this story of overcoming a literacy related challenge, writers are able to reflect on their growth as a writer and person who uses language. Literacy narratives may contain a lesson for the reader to take away, as well as a moving plot and timeline throughout the piece. Such as in other genres of writing related to narratives, literacy narratives usually contain descriptive details to help capture the emotion of the writer at that time, as well as the setting. While literacy narratives are generally based on true events, like with other narrative genres, some parts may be embellished for dramatic effect, but the essence of the story will be mostly true. While there is no general rule for a minimum or maximum length for these works, it would be common for the piece to be anywhere from a few pages to around 10 pages. Though it is possible for an AI tool to generate text, literacy narratives have value for writers to learn methods of rhetorical situation and persuasive storytelling. Instructors may also use literacy narratives as a way to introduce peer review in the classroom.

Research methodology

The literacy narrative is also employed as a qualitative research methodology for studying literacy itself, most notably used by scholars such as Deborah Brandt.

Reflection

Literacy narratives generally involve a large amount of reflection on the part of the writer. This could be reflecting on language learning, how the writer viewed writing previously, past writing habits, past reading habits, etc. Due to this reflexive nature of writing, even more experienced writers may choose to write a literacy narrative in an effort to reflect deeper about a specific literacy topic.

== Notable literacy narrative writers and researchers ==
- Deborah Brandt
- Amy Tan's Mother Tongue
- Mike Rose (educator)
- Trevor Noah's "Chameleon" in Born a Crime

== See also ==
- Storytelling
- Creative nonfiction
- Personal narrative
