= 1995 Greater Pittsburgh bank robberies =

Inspiration for the Dunning–Kruger effect

On January 6, 1995, McArthur Wheeler and Clifton Earl Johnson robbed two Greater Pittsburgh banks at gunpoint without attempts to disguise themselves. Instead, they had covered their faces in lemon juice, believing it would make them invisible to security cameras. Johnson was arrested a few days later, while Wheeler was apprehended in April after being identified in surveillance photographs. Both received multi-year jail sentences. The robberies directly inspired the research of the Dunning–Kruger effect, which describes that people with little ability in a given field erroneously believe they excel in it.

== History ==
On January 6, 1995, McArthur Wheeler (Note: Also reported as MacArthur Wheeler and Macarthur J. Wheeler) and Clifton Earl Johnson robbed two banks in the Greater Pittsburgh area at gunpoint. At 2:47 p.m., at the Swissvale branch of Mellon Bank, one of them stuck up the teller with a semi-automatic handgun while the other waited in line. They left together after obtaining US$5,200 (equivalent to $10,987 in 2025). The other robbery took place at Fidelity Savings Bank in Brighton Heights.

Neither robber wore a mask or otherwise attempted to disguise himself; they had instead applied lemon juice to their faces. According to Wheeler, Johnson had told him lemon juice would make one invisible to security cameras, akin to how it functions as invisible ink. Although initially skeptical, Wheeler had tested this method by covering his face with lemon juice and capturing an image of it with a Polaroid camera. As he was missing from the resulting photograph, he trusted the method to be effective. Detectives believed his absence in the image was caused either by a bad film, a maladjusted camera, or Wheeler having unintentionally pointed the camera away from his face.

Johnson was arrested on January 12. A surveillance photograph of Wheeler was broadcast as part of a Pittsburgh Crime Stoppers segment with the 11:00 p.m. news on April 19. Anonymous tips subsequently led to Wheeler's arrest at 12:10 a.m. on April 20, less than an hour after the broadcast. When shown the photographs in which he had been identified, Wheeler was shocked and exclaimed "But I wore the lemon juice. I wore the lemon juice." Johnson pleaded guilty to the heist at Mellon Bank as well as two unrelated robberies from 1994. He testified against Wheeler and was given a five-year prison sentence on October 27. Judge Gary L. Lancaster sentenced Wheeler to 24 1/2 years in prison, followed by three years of probation, on January 5, 1996, for the Swissvale stickup. Charges for the Brighton Heights case were dropped.

== Dunning–Kruger effect ==
A brief account of the robberies was included in the 1996 edition of The World Almanac. David Dunning, a professor of social psychology at Cornell University, discovered this story and subsequently a longer article about the case in the Pittsburgh Post-Gazette. The New York Times summized he came to believe that "If Wheeler was too stupid to be a bank robber, perhaps he was also too stupid to know that he was too stupid to be a bank robber — that is, his stupidity protected him from an awareness of his own stupidity." With his graduate student Justin Kruger, he organized a research program to determine whether someone's perceived competence could be measured against their actual competence. They authored the 1999 paper "Unskilled and Unaware of It: How Difficulties in Recognizing One's Own Incompetence Lead to Inflated Self-Assessments", in which they found that "when people are incompetent in the strategies they adopt to achieve success and satisfaction, they suffer a dual burden: Not only do they reach erroneous conclusions and make unfortunate choices, but their incompetence robs them of the ability to realize it. Instead, like Mr. Wheeler, they are left with the mistaken impression that they are doing just fine." This became known as the Dunning–Kruger effect.

== Other references in literature ==
R. Lofton Hudson, a pastor and psychologist, argued that Wheeler exhibited a "lack of relational awareness" that normally was found in all humans. According to him, "we mistakenly and uncritically believe in our relational skill set when in reality those skills may be no more effective than Mr. Wheeler's special cream." In motivational literature, There Is an I in Team: What Elite Athletes and Coaches Really Know About High Performance features Wheeler as an example of the importance of critical and accurate self-examination. Wheeler's failure to understand his performance deficit was used as an argument for performance pay for teachers by an education policy think-tank. The case also became a thought experiment for criminologists to consider as an example of their incompetence.
