= Elizabeth Anderson =

Elizabeth Anderson may refer to:

- Beth Anderson (composer) (born 1950), American composer
- Betty Anderson, fictional character in the 1956 novel and subsequent 1960s US TV series Peyton Place
- Betty Anderson, fictional character in the 1950s US TV series Father Knows Best
- Betty Baxter Anderson (1908–1966), American author
- Betty Lise Anderson, American electrical engineer
- Lilly de Castella (born Elizabeth Anne Anderson), Australian colonist and winemaker
- Bessie Anderson Stanley (1879–1952), American poet
- Elizabeth Garrett Anderson (1836–1917), English physician and feminist, the first woman to gain a medical qualification in Britain
- Liz Anderson (educator) (born 1970), Canadian educator and creator of the Accelerated Learning Framework
- Liz Anderson (1927–2011), American singer-songwriter
- Elizabeth Milbank Anderson (1850–1921), American philanthropist, advocate for public health and women's education
- Elizabeth Preston Anderson (1861–1954), American suffragist and temperance worker
- Elizabeth S. Anderson (born 1959), American philosopher
- Betty Harvie Anderson (1913–1979), British politician
- Eliza Anderson Godefroy (c. 1780–1839), founder and editor of Baltimore publication The Observer
- PS Eliza Anderson (1858–1898), American paddle steamer
- Elizabeth Anderson, American politician and Democratic nominee for Alabama's 6th congressional district in 2024
- Elizabeth Anderson, New Mexico State Engineer

== See also ==
- Beth Andersen (born 1954), American pop singer and voice actress
