= Tressie McMillan Cottom =

American writer, sociologist, and professor (born 1976)

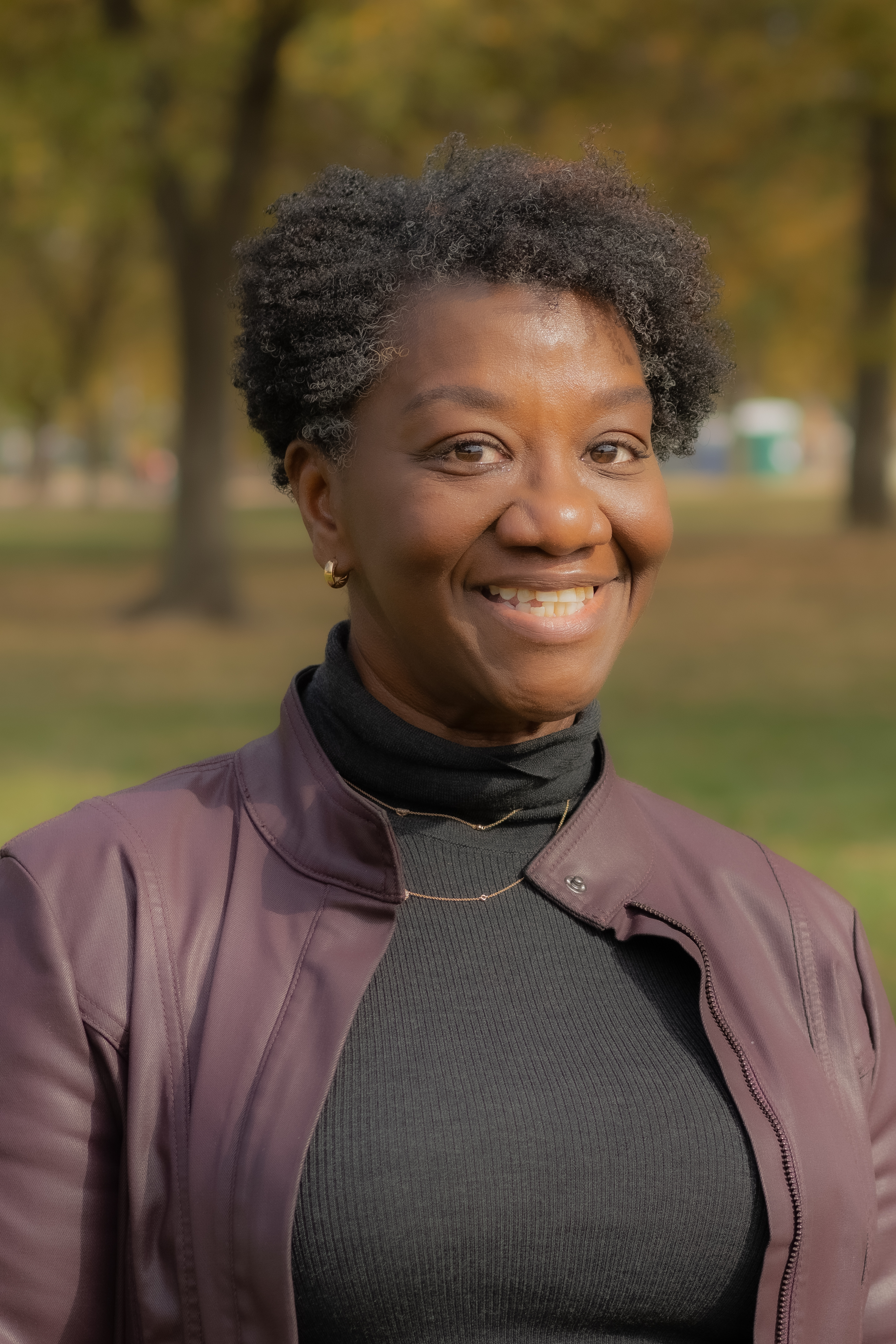
- Cottom in 2025
- Born: October 9, 1976 (age 50); Harlem, New York City, U.S.

Academic background
- Education: North Carolina Central University (BA); Emory University (MA, PhD)
- Thesis: Becoming Real Colleges in the Financialized Era of U.S. Higher Education: The Expansion and Legitimation of For-Profit Colleges (2015)

Academic work
- Discipline: Sociology
- Institutions: University of North Carolina at Chapel Hill; Virginia Commonwealth University; Berkman Klein Center for Internet & Society
- Main interests: American higher education, race, inequality, work, technology
- Notable works: Thick: And Other Essays; Lower Ed: The Troubling Rise of For-Profit Colleges in the New Economy

Tressie McMillan Cottom (born October 9, 1976) is an American writer, sociologist, and professor. She is an associate professor at the University of North Carolina at Chapel Hill School of Information and Library Science (SILS) and an affiliate of the Center for Information, Technology, and Public Life (CITAP) at UNC-Chapel Hill. She is also an opinion columnist at The New York Times.

She was formerly an associate professor of sociology at Virginia Commonwealth University and a faculty associate of the Berkman Klein Center for Internet & Society. McMillan Cottom is the author of Lower Ed: The Troubling Rise of For-Profit Colleges in the New Economy and Thick: And Other Essays, a co-editor of For-Profit Universities and Digital Sociologies, an essayist whose work has appeared in The Atlantic, Slate, The New York Times, and The Washington Post, and co-host of the podcast Hear to Slay with author Roxane Gay. She is frequently quoted as an academic expert on inequality and American higher education in print and television media. In 2020, McMillan Cottom was awarded a MacArthur Fellowship in recognition of her work "at the confluence of race, gender, education, and digital technology."

== Early life and education ==
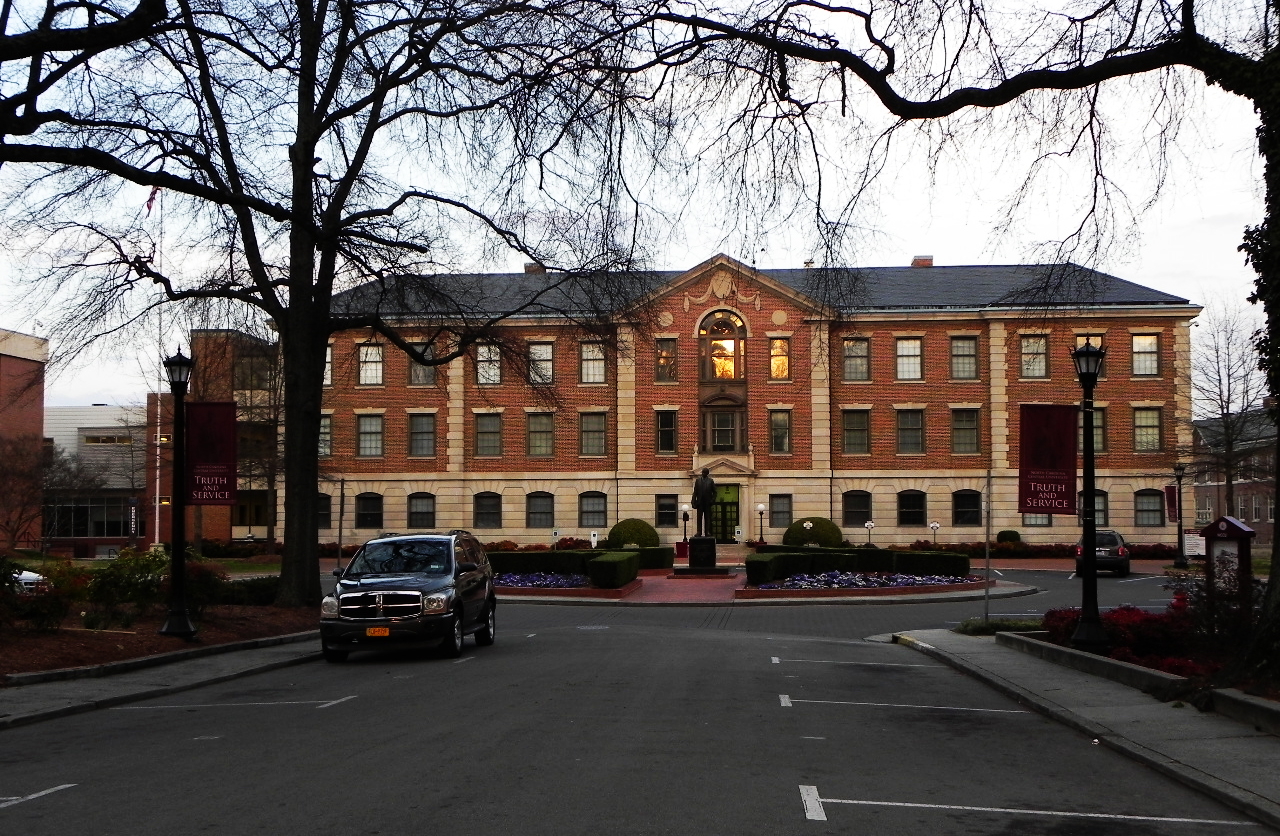
North Carolina Central University, where McMillan Cottom earned her BA

McMillan Cottom was born in Harlem and raised in Winston-Salem and Charlotte, North Carolina. Her mother was a member of the Black Panther Party in Winston-Salem. Before completing her undergraduate degree, McMillan Cottom worked as an enrollment officer at a technical college, a job that would inform her later research and her first book. In 2009, McMillan Cottom received a B.A. from North Carolina Central University, a public HBCU, in English and political science.

While pursuing her Ph.D. at Emory University, McMillan Cottom was a visiting fellow at the University of California, Davis Center for Poverty Research and a Microsoft Research Social Media Collective intern. She also wrote the biweekly "Counter Narrative" column for Slate magazine. She earned a PhD in sociology from Emory University in 2015, with a dissertation on the legitimacy of for-profit higher education institutions.

== Career ==
In 2015, McMillan Cottom was appointed assistant professor of sociology at Virginia Commonwealth University and a faculty associate at the Berkman Klein Center for Internet & Society. She was awarded tenure and promoted to the rank of associate professor in 2019. In 2020, she left Virginia Commonwealth University to join the faculty of the University of North Carolina at Chapel Hill.

=== Public persona ===
Before the publication of her book Lower Ed, McMillan Cottom was known primarily as an essayist and academic expert on issues of inequality, higher education, and race. She writes from the analytical perspective of intersectionality. Her essays have advocated for reparations to African Americans, argued that racism rather than political correctness is the real threat to university campus life, and suggested that black girls are treated as more adult than white girls. She is a contributing editor at Dissent and one of HuffPost's commissioned opinion columnists. In addition to her own writing, McMillan Cottom has been featured in The New York Times, National Public Radio (NPR), Harvard Educational Review, Mother Jones, Inside Higher Ed, and The Daily Show.

Drawing on her experience dealing with controversy as a public intellectual, McMillan Cottom wrote a guide for academics who come under public attack from organized digital campaigns. In 2019, McMillan Cottom and Roxane Gay launched a podcast called Hear to Slay to "amplify the voices and work of black women". McMillan Cottom received the Public Understanding of Sociology Award from the American Sociological Association in 2020.

=== Lower Ed ===
McMillan Cottom's 2017 book Lower Ed analyzes the for-profit educational sector from the perspective of students trying to navigate a "risky and highly variable" economy. Lower Ed is based on interviews with students and college executives, analysis of for-profit college promotional materials, and McMillan Cottom's own experience working as an enrollment officer at two for-profit institutions. The main finding is that rising emphasis on credentialism in the American job market pushes students to make riskier but individually rational trade-offs to obtain educational credentials.

According to McMillan Cottom, for-profit institutions are generally more expensive than non-profit institutions and aggressively market to low-income and working poor students who qualify for the most financial aid, but students are making considered choices about their futures and are not simply being duped by marketing. Lower Ed suggests that policies intended to constrain the marketing behavior of for-profit institutions will not address the underlying political economy issue, and may increase inequalities, especially gender inequalities, in the distribution of valued educational credentials and jobs. Harvard Educational Review described Lower Ed as "theoretically provocative, empirically rich, and enjoyable to read".

=== Thick ===
McMillan Cottom's book Thick: And Other Essays was published by The New Press in 2019. John Warner, writing for the Chicago Tribune, described Thick as "the story of Cottom's life" but also "a kind of manifesto". The book draws on examples from McMillan Cottom's life in the form of personal essays. These essays touch on topics including sexual abuse, divorce, and the death of a child to discuss broader issues in race, beauty, and education, such as why black women can never be seen as beautiful, why universities prefer African students to African American students, and how assumptions about wealth, competence, and pain undermine black women's efforts to achieve health and financial security.

Publishers Weekly gave Thick a starred review, concluding that "the collection showcases Cottom's wisdom and originality". Rebecca Stoner, writing for Pacific Standard, praised the broad appeal of Thick, noting that McMillan Cottom "makes it possible for her readers, whether or not they are black women, to understand the interdependent nature of our oppressions". The New York Times praised "the author's skillful interweaving of the academic with the popular" and concluded that Thick "is sure to become a classic of black intellectualism". Thick was a finalist for the 2019 National Book Award for Nonfiction.

== Awards ==
- 2017: Sociologists for Women in Society Feminist Activism Award
- 2019: American Sociological Association Doris Entwisle Early Career Award
- 2019: Adweek Podcast Award for Podcast Hosts of the Year
- 2020: American Sociological Association Public Understanding of Sociology Award
- 2020: Macarthur Genius Grant Winner
- 2023: PEN Oakland/Third Annual Reginald Martin Award for Excellence in Criticism.

== Works ==
=== Books ===
- (Co-editor, with William A. Darity Jr.) For-Profit Universities: The Shifting Landscape of Marketized Higher Education (Palgrave MacMillan, 2016) ISBN 9783319471860
- (Co-editor, with Jesse Daniels and Karen Gregory) Digital Sociologies (Policy Press, 2016) ISBN 9781447329015
- Lower Ed: The Troubling Rise of For-Profit Colleges in the New Economy (The New Press, 2017) ISBN 9781620970607
- Thick: And Other Essays (The New Press, 2019) ISBN 978-1620974360

=== Selected essays ===
- "No, college isn't the answer. Reparations are." Washington Post, April 29, 2014.
- "The Coded Language of For-Profit Colleges." The Atlantic, February 22, 2017.
- "How We Make Black Girls Grow Up Too Fast." The New York Times, June 29, 2017.
- "The Real Threat to Campuses Isn't 'PC Culture.' It's Racism." Huffington Post, February 19, 2018.
- "The Enduring, Invisible Power of Blond." The New York Times, January 19, 2023.
- "The Way Harris Lost Will Be Her Legacy." The New York Times, November 6, 2024.
