= Grawemeyer Awards =

Awards given annually by the University of Louisville

The Grawemeyer Awards (/ˈɡrɔːmaɪ.ər/) are five awards given annually by the University of Louisville. The prizes are presented to individuals in the fields of education, ideas improving world order, music composition, religion, and psychology. The religion award is presented jointly by the University of Louisville and the Louisville Presbyterian Theological Seminary. Initially, the awards came with a bonus of US$150,000 each, making them among the most lucrative in their respective fields. This cash prize increased to $200,000 beginning in 2000 but the award amount dropped to $100,000 in 2011 after the fund for the prize lost money due to a drop in the stock market.

In 2015 a special award, the Spirit Award, created for the award's thirtieth anniversary, was presented to former boxer Muhammad Ali.

Some of the most notable winners include former Soviet President Mikhail Gorbachev (world order); Academy Award-winning composer Tan Dun (music composition); German theologian Jürgen Moltmann (religion); Aaron Beck, considered the founder of cognitive therapy (psychology); and former Andrew W. Mellon Foundation and Princeton University President William G. Bowen and former Harvard University President Derek Bok (education).

== Recipients ==
=== Education ===
- 1989: Bertrand Schwartz
- 1990: Howard Gardner
- 1991: Kieran Egan
- 1992: Carol Gilligan
- 1993: Roland Tharp and Ronald Gallimore
- 1994: John T. Bruer
- 1995: Shirley Brice Heath and Milbrey W. McLaughlin
- 1996: Victoria Purcell-Gates
- 1997: Mike Rose
- 1998: L. Scott Miller
- 1999: Not awarded
- 2000: Vanessa Siddle Walker
- 2001: William G. Bowen and Derek Bok
- 2002: Martha Nussbaum
- 2003: Deborah Brandt
- 2004: Not awarded
- 2005: Elliot W. Eisner
- 2006: Lee Shulman
- 2008: Walter S. Gilliam, Edward F. Zigler, and Stephanie M. Jones
- 2009: Paul Attewell and David Lavin
- 2010: Keith Stanovich
- 2011: Not awarded
- 2012: Linda Darling-Hammond
- 2013: Pasi Sahlberg
- 2014: Diane Ravitch
- 2015: Andy Hargreaves and Michael Fullan
- 2016: Karl Alexander, Linda Olson, and Doris Entwisle
- 2017: Diana Hess and Paula McAvoy
- 2018: Sara Goldrick-Rab
- 2019: Maxim Dobrosensky
- 2021: Jal Mehta and Sarah Fine
- 2022: Rucker Johnson
- 2023: Jennifer Morton
- 2024: Laura Hamilton and Kelly Nielsen
- 2025: Mark R Warren

=== Improving world order ===
- 1988: Richard Neustadt and Ernest R. May
- 1989: Robert Keohane
- 1990: Robert Jervis
- 1991: The United Nations World Commission on Environment and Development
- 1992: Samuel Huntington; Herman Daly and John Cobb
- 1993: Donald Harman Akenson
- 1994: Mikhail Gorbachev
- 1995: Gareth Evans
- 1996: Max Singer and Aaron Wildavsky
- 1997: Herbert Kelman
- 1998: Not awarded
- 1999: Not awarded
- 2000: Margaret E. Keck and Kathryn Sikkink
- 2001: Janine Wedel
- 2002: Not awarded
- 2003: Stuart J. Kaufman
- 2004: John Braithwaite and Peter Drahos
- 2005: Francis Deng and Roberta Cohen
- 2006: Fiona Terry
- 2007: Roland Paris
- 2008: Philip E. Tetlock
- 2009: Michael Johnston
- 2010: Trita Parsi
- 2011: Kevin Bales
- 2012: Séverine Autesserre
- 2013: Erica Chenoweth and Maria J. Stephan
- 2014: Jacques Hymans
- 2015: Mark S. Weiner
- 2016: Gary Haugen and Victor Boutros
- 2017: Dana Burde
- 2018: Scott Straus
- 2019: Sakiko Fukuda-Parr, Terra Lawson-Remer and Susan Randolph
- 2021: Ken Conca
- 2022: Mona Lena Krook
- 2023: Steven Feldstein
- 2024: Neta Crawford
- 2025: John M. Owen IV
- 2026: Joshua W. Busby

=== Music composition ===
- 1985: Witold Lutosławski
- 1986: György Ligeti
- 1987: Harrison Birtwistle
- 1988: Not awarded
- 1989: Chinary Ung
- 1990: Joan Tower
- 1991: John Corigliano
- 1992: Krzysztof Penderecki
- 1993: Karel Husa
- 1994: Toru Takemitsu
- 1995: John Adams
- 1996: Ivan Tcherepnin
- 1997: Simon Bainbridge
- 1998: Tan Dun
- 1999: Not awarded
- 2000: Thomas Adès
- 2001: Pierre Boulez
- 2002: Aaron Jay Kernis
- 2003: Kaija Saariaho
- 2004: Unsuk Chin
- 2005: George Tsontakis
- 2006: György Kurtág
- 2007: Sebastian Currier
- 2008: Peter Lieberson
- 2009: Brett Dean
- 2010: York Höller
- 2011: Louis Andriessen
- 2012: Esa-Pekka Salonen
- 2013: Michel van der Aa
- 2014: Đuro Živković
- 2015: Not awarded
- 2016: Hans Abrahamsen
- 2017: Andrew Norman
- 2018: Bent Sørensen
- 2019: Joël Bons
- 2021: Lei Liang
- 2022: Olga Neuwirth
- 2023: Julian Anderson
- 2024: Aleksandra Vrebalov
- 2025: Christian Mason
- 2026: Liza Lim

=== Psychology ===
- 2001: Michael Posner, Marcus Raichle and Steven Petersen
- 2002: James McClelland and David Rumelhart
- 2003: Daniel Kahneman and Amos Tversky
- 2004: Aaron Beck
- 2005: Elizabeth Loftus
- 2006: John O'Keefe and Lynn Nadel
- 2007: Giacomo Rizzolatti, Vittorio Gallese and Leonardo Fogassi
- 2008: Albert Bandura
- 2009: Anne Treisman
- 2010: Ronald Melzack
- 2011: Walter Mischel
- 2012: Leslie Ungerleider and Mortimer Mishkin
- 2013: Irving Gottesman
- 2014: Antonio Damasio
- 2015: James McGaugh
- 2016: Steven Maier
- 2017: Marsha Linehan
- 2018: Robert Sternberg
- 2019: Kent Berridge and Terry Robinson
- 2021: Robert Plomin
- 2022: Terrie Moffitt
- 2023: David Dunning and Justin Kruger
- 2024: Ann Masten
- 2025: James Gross
- 2026: Simon Baron-Cohen

=== Religion ===
- 1990: E. P. Sanders
- 1991: John Hick
- 1992: Ralph Harper
- 1993: Elizabeth Johnson
- 1994: Stephen L. Carter
- 1995: Diana L. Eck
- 1996: Not awarded
- 1997: Larry L. Rasmussen
- 1998: Charles R. Marsh
- 1999: Not awarded
- 2000: Jürgen Moltmann
- 2001: James Kugel
- 2002: Miroslav Volf
- 2003: Mark Juergensmeyer
- 2004: Jonathan Sacks
- 2005: George Marsden
- 2006: Marilynne Robinson
- 2007: Timothy Tyson
- 2008: Margaret A. Farley
- 2009: Donald Shriver Jr.
- 2010: Eboo Patel
- 2011: Luke Timothy Johnson
- 2012: Barbara D. Savage
- 2013: Leila Ahmed
- 2014: Tanya Luhrmann
- 2015: Willie James Jennings
- 2016: Susan R. Holman
- 2017: Gary Dorrien
- 2018: James Cone
- 2019: Robert P. Jones
- 2021: Stephen J. Patterson
- 2022: Duncan Ryuken Williams
- 2023: Kelly Brown Douglas
- 2024: Charles Halton
- 2025: Rabbi Julia Watts Belser
- 2026: Candida Moss

=== Spirit Award ===
- 2015: Muhammad Ali

== See also ==
- List of psychology awards
- List of religion-related awards
