= Andrew Hargreaves =

Andrew Hargreaves may refer to:

- Andrew Hargreaves (politician) (born 1955), British Conservative Party
- Andy Hargreaves (academic) (born 1951), Boston College
