= John Braithwaite (criminologist) =

Australian criminologist

John Braithwaite (born 30 July 1951 in Ipswich, Australia) is a distinguished professor at the Australian National University. Braithwaite is the recipient of a number of international awards and prizes for his work, including an honorary doctorate at KU Leuven (2008), the University of Louisville Grawemeyer Award with Peter Drahos for Ideas Improving World Order (2004), and the Prix Emile Durkheim, International Society of Criminology, for lifetime contributions to criminology (2005). In 2024 he was awarded the Balzan Prize for "Restorative Justice".

His writings on regulatory capitalism have influenced regulatory scholars in other countries, such as Canadian political scientists G. Bruce Doern, Michael J. Prince and Richard Shultz.

== Career ==
As a criminologist, he is particularly interested in the role of restorative justice, shame management and reintegration in crime prevention. His book Crime, Shame and Reintegration (1989) demonstrated that current criminal justice practice tends to stigmatize offenders, making the crime problem worse. Braithwaite argues that restorative justice enables both offenders and citizens, by way of mediation, to repair the social harm caused by crime. He has also worked with Philip Pettit on the application of republican theory to criminal law and regulation.

Braithwaite's other contributions include the development and application of responsive regulation frameworks and restorative justice to many areas of business regulation, health care and aged care. He is the founder of the School of Regulation and Global Governance (RegNet, formerly the Regulatory Institutions Network), a large interdisciplinary research group within the College of Asia and the Pacific at the Australian National University, working on complex issues of regulation and governance. He is a former Australian Research Council (ARC) Federation Fellow at RegNet.

He is further exploring ideas related to restorative justice and responsive regulation in the 20-year comparative project called Peacebuilding Compared, an ambitious study comparing peacebuilding efforts in 48 conflicts throughout the world.

One of his recent books, Anomie and Violence: Non-truth and Reconciliation in Indonesian Peacebuilding, found that peacebuilding in Papua, Maluku and North Maluku, Central Sulawesi, West Kalimantan and Central Kalimantan, and Aceh was largely achieved through non-truth and reconciliation.

== Works ==
- J. Braithwaite, V. Braithwaite, M. Cookson & L. Dunn (2010). Anomie and Violence: Non-truth and Reconciliation in Indonesian Peacebuilding, Canberra: ANU E-Press, 2010. ISBN 9781921666230
- J. Braithwaite (2008). Regulatory Capitalism: How it Works, Ideas for Making it Work Better, Cheltenham: Edward Elgar. ISBN 9781848441262
- J. Braithwaite, T. Makai & V. Braithwaite (2007). Regulating Aged Care: Ritualism and the New Pyramid, Cheltenham: Edward Elgar.
- J. Braithwaite (2005). Markets in Vice, Markets in Virtue, Sydney and New York, Federation Press and Oxford University Press.
- J. Braithwaite (2002). Restorative Justice and Responsive Regulation, New York: Oxford University Press. ISBN 9780195158397
- P. Drahos and J. Braithwaite (2002).Information Feudalism: Who Owns the Knowledge Economy New York: Routledge.
- E. Ahmed, N. Harris, J. Braithwaite & V. Braithwaite (2001). Shame management through Reintegration, Melbourne: Cambridge University Press.
- J. Braithwaite & P. Drahos (2001). Global Business Regulation, Cambridge University Press. ISBN 9780521784993
- J. Braithwaite (2000). Regulation, Crime, Freedom, Aldershot, Ashgate
- B. Fisse & J. Braithwaite (1993). Corporations, Crime and Accountability, Cambridge University Press.
- I. Ayres & J. Braithwaite (1992) Responsive Regulation: Transcending the Deregulation Debate, Oxford University Press.
- J. Braithwaite & P. Pettit (1990). Not Just Deserts: A Republican Theory of Criminal Justice, Oxford University Press.
- J. Braithwaite (1989). Crime, Shame and Reintegration, Cambridge: Cambridge University Press. ISBN 9780521356688
- J. Braithwaite (1986). Of Manners Gentle: Enforcement Strategies of Australian Business Regulatory Agencies, Melbourne, Oxford University Press.
- J. Braithwaite (1985). To Punish or Persuade: Enforcement of Coal Mine Safety, Albany, State University of New York Press.
- J. Braithwaite & P. Grabosky (1985). Occupational Health and Safety Enforcement in Australia, Canberra, Australian Institute of Criminology.
- J. Braithwaite (1984). Corporate Crime in the Pharmaceutical Industry, London: Routledge & Kegan Paul.
- B. Fisse & J. Braithwaite (1983). The Impact of Publicity on Corporate Offenders, Albany, State University of New York Press.
- J. Braithwaite (1980). Prisons, Education and Work, Canberra and Brisbane, University of Queensland Press/Australian Institute of Criminology.
- J. Braithwaite (1979). Inequality, Crime, and Public Policy, London and Boston, Routledge & Kegan Paul.
