= Liz Anderson (educator) =

Canadian educator

Liz Anderson is an educator and "Learning Opportunity Facilitator" who works as a Principal for the Waterloo District School Board.

Born in 1970, Liz Anderson was the lead developer in the creation of the Accelerated Learning Framework which has been cited by Canadian educational researcher Michael Fullan in multiple books that include Stratosphere: Integrating Technology, Pedagogy, and Change Knowledge (2012), Motion Leadership in Action: More Skinny on Becoming Change Savvy (2012) and Coherence: The Right Drivers in Action for Schools, Districts, and Systems (2015)

Anderson has also established "Get REAL" (REAL being short for the elements of Relationships, Expectations, Authenticity and Learning) as a reflection of the interplay of the various elements of a life journey of teaching and learning.
