= Lives on the Boundary =

1989 book by Mike Rose

Lives on the Boundary: The Struggles and Achievements of America's Underprepared
- First edition
- Author: Mike Rose
- Publisher: Free Press
- Publication date: 1989

Lives on the Boundary, written by American scholar Mike Rose, is a 1989 work of non-fiction that explores the challenges and successes associated with literacy at the margins of America’s education system. Much of the work is autobiographical and explores Rose’s own challenges both learning and teaching reading and writing. The narrative base helps the reader form a personal connection to Rose, his colleagues, and his students. This book ultimately gives a voice to those marginalized by America's education system.

== Premise ==
Like so many other Americans, Mike Rose was labelled illiterate at an early age. Growing up in a home raised by 1st generation, non-native English speaking parents, Rose encountered deep issues with language barriers from an early age. His humble-beginnings help start Lives on the Boundary with a narrative base that helps the reader form a personal connection to not only Rose, but the individuals this book was written for or on behalf of ultimately giving a voice to those growing up without a voice in the education system in the United States. Elizabeth Auleta's book review of Rose's text was published in 1990 just a year after the original publication of Lives on the Boundary. Auleta writes, ″It is a book about the abilities hidden by class and cultural barriers. And it is a book about movement: about what happens as people who have failed begin to participate in the educational system that has seemed so harsh and distant to them.″ She goes on to acknowledge that Rose asks his audience to place his stories in a larger social context so that the premise of the book extends to any disenfranchised kid's struggle. Rose's book intertwines his story with those stories of the students he mentored during his 20 years as a professor/instructor--Auleta echoes in her review the book's ability to remediate, set curriculum references, teach (even the teacher), and document literacy as a narrative struggle of mastership, observation, and engagement.

== Legacy ==
First published in 1989, Lives on the Boundary has gone on to become one of the most significant books in the field of education. In addition to being a bestselling book, Lives on the Boundary is the recipient of the National Council of Teachers of English David H. Russell Award for Distinguished Research in the Teaching of English. There are many other instances where instructors and research writers have used Mike Rose's literature as the foundation or outline for their own work. Candace Spigelman's ″Discussing Lives on the Boundary in a Basic Writing Class″ explores students vs. the educational system while using Rose's text as an outline. Have You Heard? podcast, ep. #36 ″The Skills Trap" features an interview with Rose discussing his book. Scholar Glynda Hull co-wrote ″This Wooden Shack Place″: The Logic of an Unconventional Reading along with Rose; the article highlights Rose's teaching methods with close reading analysis. Website BookRags offers an online lesson plan for integrating Rose's work into the classroom with a focus on high school students grade 7-12.
