= Victoria Purcell-Gates =

American academic

Victoria Purcell-Gates is an internationally recognized researcher and professor in the field of literacy education. Using both qualitative and quantitative research methods, Dr. Purcell-Gates' research interests include the social and cultural literacy practices experienced by both children and adults.

== Education ==
Victoria Purcell-Gates earned a B.A. in English Education from Northern Arizona University and both an M.A. and Ph.D. in Language and Literacy from the University of California, Berkeley.

== Career ==
Dr. Purcell-Gates taught at Michigan State University, Harvard University, the University of Cincinnati, U.C. Berkeley, and the University of British Columbia. As professor and researcher at both Harvard and the University of Cincinnati, she was director of literacy centers in which both children and adults were provided with reading instruction.

While in Ohio, in 1989, Dr. Purcell-Gates was approached by an urban Appalachian woman, Jenny who was concerned about her son. Donny, age seven was caught in a cycle of family illiteracy and his mother desired Dr. Purcell-Gates' assistance. This encounter acted as the impetus for an ethnographic study focusing on the cycle of low literacy. She also questioned how an individual's cultural literacy experiences influence print literacy development. This research led to the Grawemeyer Award winning book, "Other People's Words: The Cycle of Low Literacy" (1997).

Dr. Purcell-Gates was the National Reading Conference (NRC) president for 2005–2006. Later, Dr. Purcell-Gates accepted the position of Tier 1 Canada Research Chair for Early Childhood Literacy at the University of British Columbia. She is also the principal investigator for the Cultural Practices of Literacy Study (CPLS). Within a socio-cultural framework, researchers question how schools address the needs of marginalized communities.

== Publications ==
Victoria Purcell-Gates has authored or co-authored books including Other People's Words: The Cycle of Low Literacy (1997), Print Literacy Development: Uniting Cognitive and Social Practice Theories (2006), Now We Read, We See, We Speak: Portrait of Literacy Development in an Adult Freirean-Based Class (2000), Cultural Practices of Literacy: Case Studies of Language, Literacy, Social Practice, and Power (2007), and Creating Authentic Materials and Activities for the Adult Literacy Classroom: A Handbook for Practitioners (2003).

Additional publications include chapters within books and peer-reviewed journals.

== Awards ==
- Victoria Purcell-Gates was inducted into the International Reading Association's Reading Hall of Fame on May 4, 2005.
- Oscar Causey Award by National Reading Conference for Outstanding Contributions to Literacy Research, 2004.
- Noted Scholar Appointment by University of British Columbia, Vancouver. Summer 2002.
- University of Louisville Grawemeyer Award in Education. For originality, creativity, feasibility and scope of potential applicability of ideas that help make the world a better place. Award given for Other People's Words: The Cycle of Low Literacy (Harvard University Press, 1995). $150,000. 1996.
- Most Promising Researcher. Awarded by the National Council of Teachers of English. 1987.
- Finalist in the Outstanding Dissertation of the Year Award competition. Awarded by the International Reading Association. 1987.
- Promising Researcher Award for dissertation research. Awarded by the National Council of Teachers of English. 1987.
- Outstanding Doctoral Dissertation for 1985–1987 in Phi Delta Kappa District II. Awarded by Phi Delta Kappa on Evaluation, Development and Research. 1987.
