= Thick: And Other Essays =

2019 essay collection by Tressie McMillan Cottom

- The cover of the first edition
- Author: Tressie McMillan Cottom
- Language: English
- Subject: Black womanhood; American society; media
- Publisher: The New Press
- Publication date: January 8, 2019
- Publication place: United States
- Media type: Print; digital
- Pages: 272 (1st edition)
- ISBN: 978-1-62097-587-9
- Website: thenewpress.com/books/thick

Thick: And Other Essays is a collection of essays by the American sociologist Tressie McMillan Cottom. The book explores a range of topics, including black womanhood, body image, and McMillan Cottom's experience as a Southern black woman academic. Published in 2019 by The New Press, Thick was a finalist for that year's National Book Award.

== Synopsis ==
Thick: And Other Essays is a collection of essays "about how American culture treats black women". McMillan Cottom centers her personal experience as a Southern black public intellectual, and writes on topics such as the loss of a child, sexual abuse, body image, and beauty politics. Black womanhood and black girlhood are two prominent themes. McMillan Cottom explained the title of the book in an interview with WBUR: "There's this category out there that we think of as 'thick.' But there's also, one of the plays on the title essay is that idea that I also wanted to connect how we move through the world physically as women, with black women's bodies in this world, and connect that to our political thought and the way that we think and approach the world."

The collection includes eight essays and covers as variety of topics, including blackness (particularly her experiences as a black woman), politics, beauty (and ugliness), and race relations, and many more personal/political topics.

The eight essays are: "Thick", "In The Name of Beauty", "Dying to be Competent", "Know Your Whites", "Black Is Over (Or, Special Black)", "The Price of Fabulousness", "Black Girlhood, Interrupted", and "Girl 6".

In the first essay, titled "Thick", McMillan Cottom describes her life story, from being "bow-legged" to being a graduate student, which she equates to being "not a real person". McMillan Cottom goes into detail about the task of "fixing her feet" both literally and figuratively as she progressed in life. As she progressed and was able to walk, she also had to adjust to life as a black academic. While McMillan Cottom was very successful as a graduate student, she became uneasy about how best to make a name for herself as being known solely as "the graduate student" felt impersonal and isolating. She goes on to explain how navigating life as a young academic of color was tricky as she had to find a place for her work and a place in which her voice could thrive. She notes the rigor in which the black woman works, oftentimes just in an effort to make ends meet, and notes that while she worked as a grad student and young academic, she often worked "the wrong way" as she contributed to projects and publications that were eager to have a piece by a black woman without actually hiring one. The purpose of the collection is to contribute to and encourage scholarly conversation and content for black women.

In the essay "Know Your Whites", Cottom delineates the rise of US President Barack Obama, and the election of his successor, Donald Trump. Specifically, McMillan Cottom expresses the belief that the same whites who cherished Obama's faith in racial progress and race relations voted for him because they saw their idyllic selves mirrored in him, and that he also afforded them the chance to romanticize this notion of progress without having to actually work for it at all, which is why some of the same whites who voted for him voted for Trump. When Obama identified more with blackness than with whiteness, white voters went with someone who embodied whiteness more thoroughly. Obama's mixed heritage and habit of trying to speak for two different racial realities, McMillan Cottom argues, is why he failed to predict Trump's rise as his faith in white America made him blind to the hateful nuances of whiteness when it feels it must respond against the presence and prominence of blackness. McMillan Cottom states that while Obama still might be hopeful for the progress of white America, it is black America that she finds reassuringly hopeful and steady.

McMillan Cottom ends her essay collection with "Girl 6" in which she touts the power of the black womanhood and its collective perspective, noting that throughout time, black women have been seen as reliable indicators of trends, and concludes noting that there a very few liberal women of color writers at prominent publications.

== Awards and nominations ==
- 2019 - National Book Award (Finalist), Nonfiction
- 2019 - Reading Women's Award, Nonfiction
- 2019 - Brooklyn Public Library Literary Prize, Nonfiction

== Critical reception ==
In a review for the Los Angeles Review of Books, Maggie Levantoskaya wrote, "The playful, familiar tone of the eight essays reminds readers why the author has captured the attention of The Atlantic, the Washington Post, Slate, and her many social media followers. The essays in Thick are economical in their use of words. They can deliver a swift punch in the gut but also be pithy, tongue-in-cheek, and fun." Camille Acker's review for The New York Times stated, "'Thick' is sure to become a classic of black intellectualism, one that ought to be read not only in African-American and gender studies departments across the country, although its lens is irrefutably and irresistibly black and feminist." The Guardian listed the book as one of the "Best Books of 2019" and praised the collection for being "studied consideration born of intensive research, shored with the digestibility of personal experience". The book received a starred review from Publishers Weekly, which praised the collection as "incisive, witty, and provocative". Thick was named a notable book by Time and the New York Times Book Review.
