= Corporate Crime in the Pharmaceutical Industry =

1984 book by John Braithwaite

- First edition
- Author: John Braithwaite
- Subject: Corporate crime, pharmaceutical industry
- Publisher: Routledge
- Publication date: 1984
- Pages: 448
- ISBN: 978-0710200495

Corporate Crime in the Pharmaceutical Industry is a 1984 book on corporate crime and the pharmaceutical industry by criminologist John Braithwaite.

The author writes from the perspective of a criminologist and not from a perspective of expertise in drug law or pharmacology.

Various reviewers commented on the book.

The author produced a follow-up book 30 years later titled, Pharmaceuticals, Corporate Crime and Public Health. At the release of that new book a reviewer reconsidered the 1984 book in retrospect and reported that the book's ideas were still relevant.

The book is available at the Internet Archive.
