= Peter Drahos =

Australian academic

Professor Peter Drahos is an Australian academic and researcher specializing in the areas of intellectual property and global business regulation amongst others. He is the Director of the Centre for Governance of Knowledge and Development and was formerly the Head of Program of the Regulatory Institutions Network at the Australian National University. He has served in an advisory capacity to various governments and international organisations on intellectual property issues and holds a Chair in Intellectual Property at the University of London. He is also a member of the Australian Bar. He was a 2004 recipient, along with John Braithwaite, of the University of Louisville Grawemeyer Award for Ideas Improving World Order.

== Selected publications ==
=== Books ===
- Information Feudalism: Who Controls the Knowledge Economy? (with John Braithwaite), The New Press, 2002
- Global Intellectual Property Rights: Knowledge, Access and Development, (with Ruth Mayne), Macmillan, 2002
- Global Business Regulation, (with John Braithwaite), Cambridge University Press, 2000, received the 2004 University of Louisville Grawemeyer Award for Ideas Improving World Order.
- A Philosophy of Intellectual Property, Dartmouth, 1996. (Translated into Persian, Japanese, Spanish and Chinese)

=== Articles ===
- Time for a Treaty? 2005
- Thinking Strategically about Intellectual Property Rights 1997
- Four Lessons for Developing Countries from the Trade Negotiations over Access to Medicine 2007
