= Literacy in American Lives =

2001 book by Deborah Brandt

Literacy in American Lives (2001) is a book by Deborah Brandt that depicts the dynamic conditions of literacy learning for Americans born between 1895 and 1985. Brandt uses the idea of Sponsors of Literacy as an analytical framework for approaching, describing, and analyzing her research and data. According to Brandt, sponsors of literacy are "any agents, local or distant, concrete or abstract, who enable, support, teach, and model, as well as recruit, regulate, suppress, or withhold literacy – and gain advantage by it in some way." Literacy in American Lives uses the literacy histories of Americans from all walks of life to illustrate the effects that the changing economic, political, and sociocultural conditions in American society had on literacy acquisition and usage in the 1900s.

== Chapter 1: Literacy, Opportunity, and Economic Change ==
According to Brandt, "Literacy ability, corporate profitability, and national productivity have all become entangled." The first chapter of Deborah Brandt's Literacy in American Lives emphasizes how changing economic conditions and regional restructuring affected the opportunities people had for learning to read and write. Brandt discusses the lives of two women who acquired literacy in a farming family economy during different eras to illustrate many of these important points. Both women graduated high school but the one from 1903, Martha Day, became a journalist while the woman from 1971, Barbara Hunt, became a cashier at a local grocery store. This occupational contrast illustrates how the value of "farming family" literacy abilities decreased significantly and the standards for literacy in American society rose rapidly during that period. It also highlights the effect of changing social and cultural factors. Martha Day was from an era where many children were raised on farms but Barbara Hunt was not. Thus, Day was able to transition more smoothly into a different lifestyle and occupation because her upbringing was more common in society at that time than in Hunt's. Finally, the accounts of the two women demonstrate the dynamic state of literacy sponsorship in America. In the early twentieth century, when Day was searching for an occupation after high school, the popular press was emerging as a major sponsor of literacy so she was able to acquire a position as a journalist, which further facilitated the growth of her literacy skills. However, by the second half of the twentieth century, the influence of the popular press in literacy sponsorship was diminishing so the same opportunities were not available to Barbara Hunt when she was searching for an occupation after graduating high school. Thus, in using these two literacy history narratives, Brandt illustrates how the value of basic literacy skills, the identities and influences of economic sponsors, and job opportunities available to those with a high school education changed drastically during the 1900s.

== Chapter 2: Literacy and Illiteracy in Documentary America ==
The second chapter of Deborah Brandt's Literacy in American Lives discusses the ways in which economic and political viability in American society became dependent on individuals being literate. Brandt writes, "In relationship to illiterates, literates enjoy more autonomy and prerogative; in a practical sense, their liberties are worth more." This was, in large part, due to many aspects of social, economic, and political relationships being conducted through written documents. Those incapable of understanding and participating in these literacy-requiring aspects of social, economic, and political life were placed at a distinct disadvantage to those that could read and understand them. This transition to a documentary-based society, or an "advanced contractarian society" as author Edward Stevens termed it in his book, Literacy, Law, and Social Order (1988), was primarily due to the rapid growth and development of corporations. According to Brandt, "Direct market relations between individuals gave way to corporate-style activity – a growth in bureaucratic structures, interdependence, planning, restrictions on the flow of information, and other forms of control, all based largely on written and other symbol-based instruments." Information in society became available only to the literate as news began to be expressed primarily in written forms such as newspapers and magazines. Once again, the value of an individual's literacy skills began to change in relation to the changing American society. New sponsors emerged and functioned to control literacy in a variety of ways in this "advanced contractarian society".

Brandt provides and analyzes two extended case studies from individuals living in the 1970s and 1980s to illustrate the impact of literacy sponsorship during this period. One individual is Dwayne Lowery, an auto worker turned union representative, and the other is Johnny Ames, a sharecropper who first learned to read and write during the 16 years he spent in a maximum security prison. In Lowery's case, demands upon his literacy skills increased precipitously over time; first, when he converted occupations to become a union representative and again as workers' unions began to acquire significant power throughout the 1970s. For example, the power of his literacy skills waned as intuitions began hiring highly educated attorneys to negotiate against him and as the agreements between the two parties began transforming from verbal to written forms. To keep pace with the demands on his literacy skills, Lowery attended numerous workshops to better learn how to read and write contracts.

In Ames's case, he was able to overcome the enormous disadvantage of failing to learn to read and write in childhood due to an uncommon institutional sponsor of literacy, the penitentiary system. Although Ames's case is not typical, Brandt presents it to demonstrate the impact of historical and political events on literacy learning. Many of the materials Ames used to teach himself to read and write concerned competing philosophies on prison management, prisoner rehabilitation, and the law. These were only acquired by the prison system because of the change that the institution had been experiencing in recent years. Similarly, Ames was able to scaffold his literacy learning on several important judicial decisions made during his time in prison because they involved the rights that he and other prisoners were allowed.

The examples of Lowery and Ames further serve to illustrate how literacy learning is often a by-product of one's struggle for economic and political ascendancy. Lowery's example demonstrated the demand placed upon his literacy skills, by a society becoming contract-oriented, as he strove for economic success. Ame's example showed how his staying informed of his political rights as a prisoner facilitated his literacy learning in prison. Furthermore, these cases illustrate how standards for literacy in America were rapidly increasing because each man would have found himself at a disadvantage without continuing to acquire literacy skills.

== Chapter 3: Accumulating Literacy: How Four Generations of One American Family Learned to Write ==
The third chapter of Deborah Brandt's Literacy in American Lives considers the impact of rapid changes in the meaning and methods of literacy using the literacy histories of members from four different generations of a Midwestern European American family. Key influences that are analyzed throughout the family members' narratives include the heritage of traditional nineteenth-century literacy in rural Midwestern conservative societies, changes in agriculture before and during the Great Depression, World War II and the desire for technological and communication skills that it created, and the relationship between advanced schooling and economic viability.

Genna May was born in 1898 on a dairy farm in central Wisconsin and she began attending school in a period when schooling was required only 12 weeks a year. Outside of school, literacy played a small role in her life and after graduating high school, she enrolled in college just long enough to learn to type and obtain a job with a company manufacturing disinfectants for dairy barns. During the Great Depression, the agricultural conditions in the Midwest changed dramatically as small family farms sold out to larger agricultural distributors. The number of people involved in agriculture decreased dramatically and many farmers found themselves performing work, such as transportation, sales, and clerical support, which required extensive record keeping. Literacy demands began changing during this period. For example, Brandt notes, "Whereas farm-based writing might have been used to keep records of a family's work and monetary dealings, keeping records – other people's records – now became the work itself." This illustrates a way in which literacy became directly linked to labor for the first time in Genna May's family history.

Genna May's son, Sam May, was born in 1925 and compared to his mother's childhood, Sam's upbringing involved reading and writing both inside and outside of school. The Great Depression brought large families from surrounding cities into his rural town and composing skits, plays, and circus routines were ways that children built a sense of community and could earn money for their economically struggling families. The development of film and radio shows also stimulated children to write to radio stations to ask for promotional items to help support their families. In these ways, the dynamic economic factors during the Great Depression affected literacy learning for youth. Later, Sam May served in the army during World War II, a literacy sponsor that brought about changes in literacy practices by demanding rapid technological advancements and providing the funds that allowed veterans like Sam May to attend college.

Sam May's son, Jack May, was born in 1958 and by this time, the May family had completed a lifestyle transition that was representative of most American families as a whole. As Brandt describes it, "[the May family] changed from farm to town, from extended family to nuclear family, and from self-employment to salary employment." These changes promoted Jack's acquisition of literacy by making him more educationally and culturally compatible with the rest of society and increasing the emphasis that the May family placed on literacy learning. Jack's parents always kept contemporary reading materials present in the household to ensure that Jack was prepared for a world that was rapidly becoming more socially and technologically based. Characteristics of literacy practices began to carry more weight in the economic and social worlds. For example, the quality of one's writing was now beginning to be seen as a reflection of an individual's characteristics, personality, and competence. Thus, practice of these literacy skills were enforced in Jack's household to the point that he acquired an aversion for several of them. After obtaining employment in the field of business, Jack received on-the-job training in literacy practices; much more than what his grandmother would have received or that Jack even needed. This exemplifies how the value and sponsors of literacy in society were changing dramatically in the United States during this period.

Jack May's son, Michael May, was born in 1981, a time when the majority of people in the same town where his great-grandmother grew up now had some type of post-secondary education and engaged in white collar work. Literacy skills were now essential to functioning in society and were taught to Michael with even greater intensity and thoroughness than was experienced by his father. Among others, Michael's childhood literacy was sponsored by the Future Problem Solving Program, which was a program designed to enrich the academic curriculum for gifted students. Although only 11 years old, Michael is writing a level far beyond that of the other May family members at that age. This represents the ideological transformations that literacy is continuing to undergo in society.

== Chapter 4: "The Power of It": Sponsors of Literacy in African American Lives ==
The fourth chapter of Deborah Brandt's Literacy in American Lives describes the major literacy sponsors of African Americans during the 1900s. The chapter begins with a discussion of the obstacles African Americans faced in acquiring literacy due to discrimination and racism in American society. According to Brandt, "Over most of the twentieth century, however, few of the channels by which literacy was being stimulated and subsidized were equally open to African Americans." Many of the economic sponsors available to white Americans were not available to African Americans because, as Brandt explains, "African Americans have rarely seen their literacy development figured into the needs of the nation." By this, Brandt means that American society developed without a reliance on or necessity for the literacy skills of African Americans, and thus, African American literacy skills were not actively promoted or encouraged to develop by American society during most of the 1900s. One notable exception to this was World War II. However, the African American Protestant church, educators, and mass movements towards mass literacy did sponsor the literacy of African Americans in a variety of ways.

Only the African American Protestant church is considered here because Brandt places the most emphasis on it her discussion of African American literacy sponsors. The African American Protestant church was an essential cultural institution sponsoring the education and literacy of African Americans during the 1900s. Because black churches were free from white domination, they were a space that provided various opportunities for African American youth to acquire literacy and leadership skills. The black church also provided support and assistance to African Americans in other ways. Brandt writes, "Members of African American churches also organized to provide housing, health care, capital investment, and insurance." They not only sponsored literacy development but human development as well. Brandt states it best, "Inevitably, churches became the organizational base of the civil rights movement as it grew to unprecedented strength in mid-century, and churches continue to serve as incubators for black elected officials and community organizers in society today." Thus, it is evident that African Americans did have unique literacy sponsors and that these literacy sponsors continue to play a major role in the literacy development of African Americans in the United States.

== Chapter 5: The Sacred and the Profane: Reading versus Writing in Popular Memory ==
The fifth chapter of Deborah Brandt's Literacy in American Lives discusses the differences in reading and writing teachings of religious institutions. In particular, many religious institutions and branches of religious institutions sought to teach their members reading skills but were criticized by their institutional authorities for teaching writing skills. First, writing was criticized as being too secular of an activity and also as too vocational. Second, and more importantly, writing was associated with upwards mobility and this was something that conservative church leaders wanted to prevent the lower class from obtaining. They thought it would disrupt the social and economic equilibrium that they worked to create.

The chapter then discusses the different views on reading and writing that were held by several other institutions and how these views affected the literacy acquisition of American citizens during this era. For example, in her discussion of the American public school system, Brandt writes, "Reading has always enjoyed more "divine" status in education, in terms of budget expenditures, scholarly attention, and public concern. Reading, has always been a more clearly defined curricular activity, whereas definitions of writing in school have continued to shift, from the mechanical art of copying to grammar to exposition to creative expression and personal growth." These different views on reading and writing has made the acquisition of writing skills harder than the acquisition of reading skills because it was difficult to standardize definitions or writing.

Additionally, reading has always had a more clearly defined role in American society compared to writing, and this has affected the degree of sponsorship each of these skills has received. However, as Resnick and Resnick put it in their book The nature of literacy: A historical exploration (1977), in present society, people need to be able to do more things with words than they needed to in the past, and this has led to increased sponsorship of writing from schools, churches, economic institutions, etc. Thus, we are currently in an era that is experiencing a shift from teaching writing skills to a few people to teaching writing skills on a more massive scale.

== Chapter 6: The Means of Production: Literacy and Stratification at the Twenty-First Century ==
The sixth and final chapter of Deborah Brandt's Literacy in American Lives discusses they ways in which literacy causes economic stratification of the American population. According to Brandt, "Where once literate skill would merely have confirmed social advantage, it is, under current economic conditions, a growing resource in social advantage itself." Schools themselves seem to propagate the problem because the schools that produce the most literate and highest achieving individuals receive the most government funding. Conversely, schools that are struggling to produce literate and high achieving individuals receive the least funding and thus, the cycle repeats with the pattern becoming more exacerbated each time. This is also intimately associated with a child's family background. For example, Brandt writes, "Children from families with poor earnings or poor understanding of school culture are more poorly prepared, and that explains their relative underachievement [in school]." This has raised many concerns as to whether children from low socioeconomic backgrounds should receive earlier and additional educational interventions to help them overcome the inherent obstacles they face in their journeys towards literacy acquisition.

Brandt also discusses the differences in out-of-school literacy learning faced by children from low socioeconomic backgrounds. She uses the literacy narratives of several individuals to illustrate the point that children from lower-class families do not have literacy integrated into their lives the way that children from middle- and upper-class families do. In arguing this point, Brandt ties together many of the overarching themes from the book, namely the roles of different sponsors of literacy and the different degrees of access children and families have to them. In particular, Brandt points out how a child's parent's limited access to an economic sponsor of literacy impacts that child's access to educational sponsors of literacy. Thus, the result is an economically stratified American society largely based upon individuals' acquisition of literacy skills.
