= Pasi Sahlberg =

Finnish education expert (born 1959)

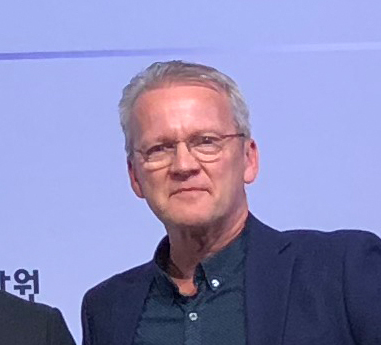
- Pasi Sahlberg at the Global HR Forum in 2018
- Born: October 26, 1959 (age 66); Oulu, Finland
- Education: University of Helsinki; University of Jyväskylä (PhD)
- Awards: Grawemeyer Award (2013)
- Scientific career
- Fields: Educational change; School improvement; Education policy
- Workplaces: Southern Cross University; University of New South Wales; Harvard University; University of Helsinki
- Thesis: Who would help a teacher – post-modern perspective on change in teaching in light of one school improvement project ProQuest 304330676 (1996)
- Website: pasisahlberg.com

Pasi Sahlberg (born 26 October 1959 in Oulu) is a Finnish education expert, author and professor at the University of Melbourne in Australia. Previously, Sahlberg has worked as a professor of practice at Harvard University at the World Bank, and as the director of the Centre for International Mobility (CIMO) in Finland. His work Finnish Lessons: What can the world learn from educational change in Finland? won the Grawemeyer Award in 2013.

== Education ==
Sahlberg graduated from the University of Helsinki in education in 1986, having earlier studied mathematics and physics. He received his PhD in Educational Sciences from the University of Jyväskylä in 1996 with a thesis titled Who would help a teacher – post-modern perspective on change in teaching in light of one school improvement project.

== Career ==
Sahlberg taught mathematics and physics for eight years in middle school and high school. His research investigates issues in educational reform, school improvement and education policy.
