= The Mind at Work =

- First edition
- Author: Mike Rose
- Published: 2004 (Viking)
- Pages: 249
- ISBN: 0-67003-282-4

The Mind at Work is a book by Mike Rose about the intellectual lives of everyday workers.
