= Lower Ed =

2017 book by Tressie McMillan Cottom

- Author: Tressie McMillan Cottom
- Subject: Higher education in the United States, sociology of education
- Publisher: The New Press
- Publication date: 2017
- Pages: 228

Lower Ed: The Troubling Rise of For-Profit Colleges in the New Economy is a 2017 book about American for-profit colleges by sociologist Tressie McMillan Cottom.
