= Sara Goldrick-Rab =

American professor, sociologist, and author

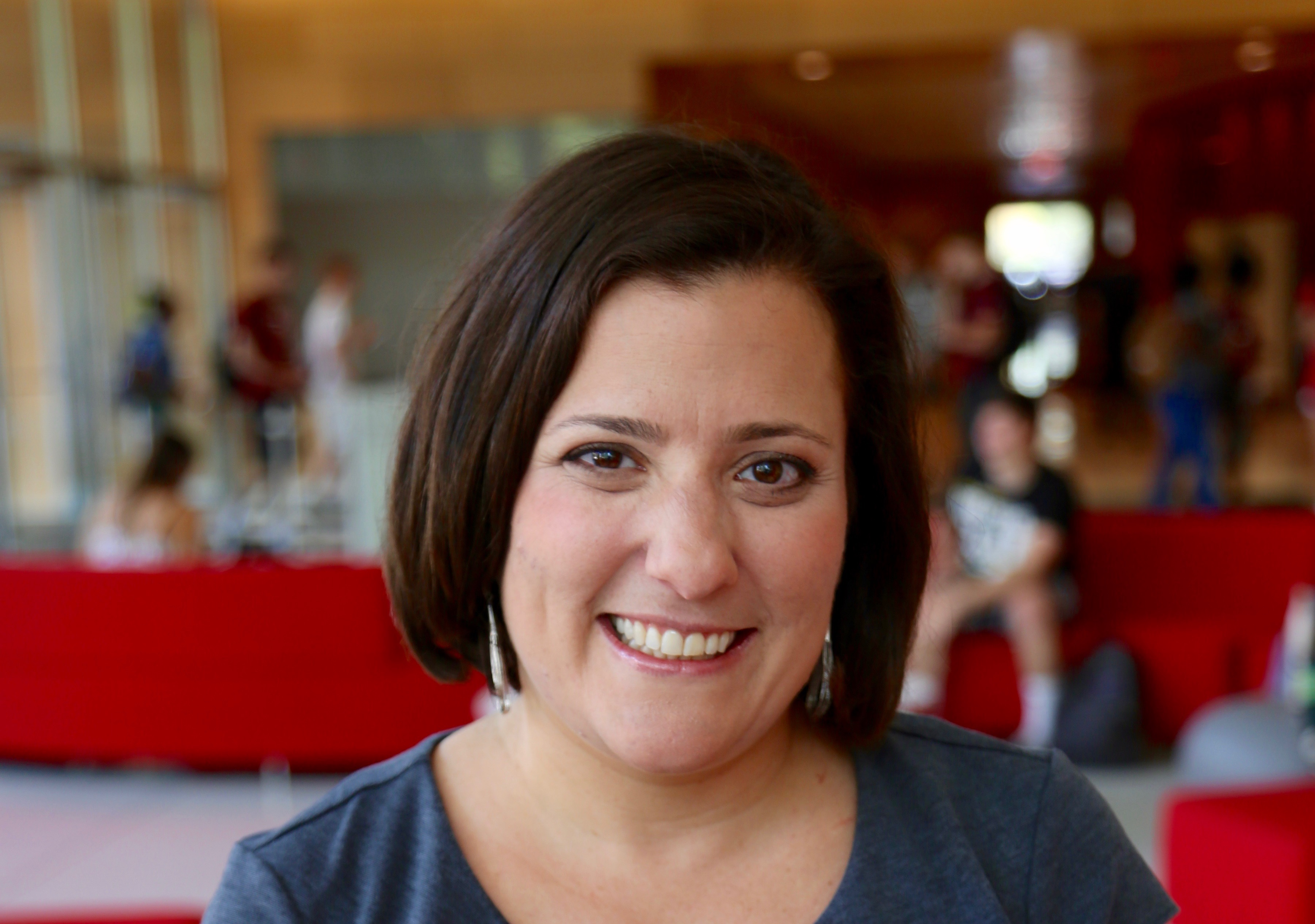
- Goldrick-Rab, 2016
- Occupation: Professor

Academic background
- Education: University of Pennsylvania

Academic work
- Discipline: Sociologist of education
- Institutions: University of Wisconsin–Madison (2004-2016), Temple University (2016-2022)

Sara Youcha Goldrick-Rab is an American professor, sociologist, and author. Goldrick-Rab was most recently the Professor of Sociology and Medicine at Temple University until she resigned in August 2022 following an investigation into her leadership.

Goldrick-Rab is the Founding Director of The Hope Center for College, Community, and Justice, the founder and Board Secretary of Believe in Students, and the Chief Strategy Officer for Emergency Aid of Edquity. A sociologist of higher education, Goldrick-Rab's research focuses on policies that aim to reduce socioeconomic and racial inequalities. She received the American Educational Research Association (AERA) Early Career Award in 2014, the 2018 Grawemeyer Award for Education, and a Carnegie Fellowship in 2018.

== Early life and education ==
Goldrick-Rab grew up in Fairfax, Virginia, a suburb of Washington, D.C. She describes herself as an "East Coast Jewish woman" who was "taught to be outspoken and forthright." Goldrick Rab attended, and graduated from, Thomas Jefferson High School for Science and Technology. Goldrick-Rab graduated from George Washington University with a Bachelor of Arts in sociology in 1998, and from the University of Pennsylvania with a Master of Arts in sociology in 2001 and a Ph.D. in sociology in 2004.

== Career ==
=== University of Wisconsin-Madison ===
She intended to pursue a career in applied research until she was encouraged to apply for a position in higher education policy and sociology at the University of Wisconsin–Madison. Goldrick-Rab accepted the position in 2004 with the intent to make Wisconsin colleges more accessible.

Her scholarship focuses on postsecondary access and equity, with particular emphasis on financial aid and community colleges. In a study with University of Wisconsin economist Douglas Harris, Goldrick-Rab explored outcomes of low-income students receiving supplemental grants and found that the grants benefitted comparatively disadvantaged students most, such as first-generation college students with lower ACT scores. In an early study of Single Stop, an on-campus program that connects community college students to government services, Goldrick-Rab found that participant retention improved.

Goldrick-Rab served as the lead author of the Brookings Institution's 2009 “Transforming America's Community Colleges” report. Many of its recommendations were included in President Barack Obama’s American Graduation Initiative later that year. She served on a Century Foundation community college equity task force, whose 2013 report recommended more funding for community colleges and reduction of economic and racial stratification between community colleges and four-year universities. As part of the report, Goldrick-Rab co-authored a background paper with Peter Kinsley that highlighted disparities between predominantly white community colleges and those with predominantly minority enrollment. On April 16, 2013, Goldrick-Rab testified before the United States Senate Committee on Health, Education, Labor and Pensions regarding the challenge of college affordability, which impacted federal legislation on financial aid limits for working students.

In April 2014, Goldrick-Rab and Nancy Kendall released a Lumina Foundation-funded report that advocated for a free two-year college option. The proposal called for all students to receive two free years of education at a public college or university, including most living expenses, in exchange for fifteen hours per week of work-study employment. The New York Times cited the report as a “clear influence on the Obama plan” for free community college introduced during the 2015 State of the Union Address. The Chronicle of Higher Education similarly included Goldrick-Rab first on their list of people who influenced the plan. Goldrick-Rab praised the Tennessee Promise program, the basis for Obama's free community college plan. While she appreciated how it makes college attendance a financial possibility for students, she noted its weakness in not providing for their living expenses.

The plan for two free years of college proposed by Goldrick-Rab and Kendall faced extensive criticism, including concerns about its lack of detail, vague definitions of length, and apparent focus on full-time students. David Breneman, an economics of education professor at the University of Virginia, described the plan as “not realistic”. Robert Kelchen, assistant professor at Seton Hall University, called the proposal "unworkable" given its removal of federal financial aid for students attending private universities. Chris Rickert of the Wisconsin State Journal argued that the plan would shortchange Wisconsin private institutions that enroll and graduate more minority students than University of Wisconsin System schools. Similarly, Minnesota higher education commissioner Larry Pogemiller emphasized that the plan neglected private institutions, covered only two years of college, and subsidized all students regardless of financial background.

Goldrick-Rab founded the Wisconsin Harvesting Opportunities for Postsecondary Education (HOPE) Lab in May 2014 to test the efficacy of college affordability programs. The lab received $6.5 million in potential funding from the Great Lakes Higher Education Corporation, and additional support from the Bill and Melinda Gates Foundation, the Kresge Foundation, the Lumina Foundation, and others. A December 2015 HOPE Lab report noted trends in food insecurity for college students. Following her The New York Times op-ed, Inside Higher Ed's Matt Reed commended Goldrick-Rab for the study's focus on student precarity rather than poverty alone.

Goldrick-Rab spoke against Wisconsin's elimination of faculty tenure from state statute in July 2015. Her subsequent Twitter activity, in which she compared the then-state governor with Adolf Hitler and discouraged future students from attending the university, drew criticism from conservative news groups. Madison's Faculty Senate steering committee responded that they were "deeply dismayed" by her actions, which they felt had damaged the principle of academic freedom. Goldrick-Rab left Wisconsin in 2016 to begin an appointment at Temple University. In her departure, she criticized the effect of the state's tenure policy on the university's teaching environment.

=== Temple University ===
In 2016, Goldrick-Rab accepted a position in higher education policy and sociology at Temple University and became the Professor of Higher Education Policy and Sociology at Temple. In 2020, she became the Professor of Sociology and Medicine at Temple.

At Temple, Goldrick-Rab founded The Hope Center for College, Community, and Justice in 2018, and she served as The Hope Center's founding director. The Hope Center, which replaced the Wisconsin HOPE Lab, is an organization that advocates for efforts to ensure that the basic needs of higher education students in the United States are met. A major project of The Hope Center is the #RealCollege movement, a movement which seeks to improve the livelihoods of higher education students in the United States by reducing rates of hunger and homelessness among U.S. college students. The Hope Center conducts an annual survey and annual conference as part of its #RealCollege initiative.

In 2016, Goldrick-Rab founded Believe in Students, a non-profit organization that supports the living expenses of college students in the United States. Goldrick-Rab is currently the Board Secretary of Believe in Students.

In 2018, Goldrick-Rab accepted a position as the Chief Strategy Officer for Emergency Aid of Edquity. Edquity is a company which uses evidence-based technology to distribute emergency aid to college students in the United States who are facing financial difficulties.

Goldrick-Rab appeared in the 2019 Doc NYC documentary Hungry to Learn, which was produced by Soledad O'Brien and Geeta Gandbhir.

In 2022 Temple announced an investigation of Goldrick-Rab's leadership of the Hope Center and placed her on administrative leave. Goldrick-Rab resigned her position at Temple in August 2022.

=== As an author ===
Goldrick-Rab wrote the book Paying the Price: College Costs, Financial Aid, and the Betrayal of the American Dream, which was published in 2016. Paying the Price is about the high cost of higher education in the United States for college and university students, and how the high cost of higher education in the United States has negatively impacted the lives of those who attend college in the United States.

== Awards ==
She received the American Educational Research Association (AERA) Early Career Award in 2014. In 2016, Goldrick-Rab was listed in the "Politico 50" list published by Politico Magazine; Goldrick-Rab was listed 13th alongside Progressive Change Campaign Committee co-founder Adam Green and Demos senior policy analyst Mark Huelsman for their work in making proposals to make higher education free for many college and university students in the United States part of the American political mainstream. In November 2017, it was announced that Goldrick-Rab won the 2018 University of Louisville Grawemeyer Award for Education, and Goldrick-Rab donated the $100,000 cash prize for winning the Grawemeyer Award for Education to a fund designed to help college students with financial emergencies. In April 2018, the Carnegie Corporation of New York awarded her a Carnegie Fellowship.

== Personal life ==
Goldrick-Rab married Liam Goldrick, who also works in education policy, in 2005, although the couple later divorced. They have two children, a son and a daughter. Goldrick-Rab married Howard Strug in 2017.

== Selected publications ==
- Goldrick-Rab, Sara. 2006. "Following Their Every Move: An Investigation of Social-Class Differences in College Pathways." Sociology of Education 79 (1):67–79.
- Goldrick-Rab, Sara. 2010. "Challenges and Opportunities for Improving Community College Student Success." Review of Educational Research 80 (3):437–69.
- Goldrick-Rab, Sara. 2016. Paying the Price: College Costs, Financial Aid, and the Betrayal of the American Dream. University of Chicago Press.
- Kelly, Andrew P. and Sara Goldrick-Rab. 2014. Reinventing Financial Aid: Charting a New Course to College Affordability. Cambridge, MA: Harvard Education Press.
- Shaw, Kathleen M., Sara Goldrick-Rab, Christopher Mazzeo, and Jerry A. Jacobs. 2006. Putting Poor People to Work: How the Work-First Idea Eroded College Access for the Poor. Russell Sage Foundation.
