= Steven Feldstein =

American political scientist

- Occupations: Researcher, analyst, writer

Steven Feldstein is an American political scientist and a senior fellow at the Carnegie Endowment for International Peace in the Democracy, Conflict, and Governance Program. His work focuses on technology, U.S. foreign policy, international relations, democracy, and human rights. Feldstein authored The Rise of Digital Repression: How Technology is Reshaping Power, Politics, and Resistance (2021), which was the recipient of the 2023 Grawemeyer Award for Ideas Improving World Order.

== Early life and education ==
He was born and raised in Bloomington, Indiana. He graduated magna cum laude from Princeton University in 2000 and earned his Juris Doctor from Berkeley Law in 2004. He worked as a consultant for InterAction where he advised the NGO on projects to promote human rights until 2017. In 2019 joined the Open Society Foundations to conduct research on the rise of digital repression globally, identifying how governments use digital assets to push their agendas.

== Career ==
Feldstein has published myriad writings on digital technology in warfare, the use of artificial intelligence in state oppression, geopolitical implications of technology, China’s digital authoritarianism, and internet repression. He developed a global AI surveillance index to track the use of digital tools by state actors and published an inventory of spyware and digital forensics used globally.

Previously, he served as an associate professor at Boise State University and sat on the Frank and Bethine Church Chair of Public Affairs.

Under President Obama, Feldstein served as the Deputy Assistant Secretary of State in the Bureau of Democracy, Human Rights and Labor (DRL). He previously served as the director of policy at the U.S. Agency for International Development, and also worked as counsel on the U.S. Senate Committee on Foreign Relations.
