= Mike Rose (educator) =

American education scholar (1944–2021)

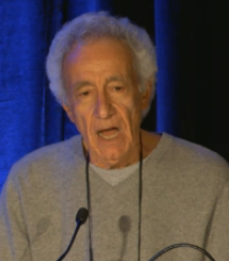
- Rose in April 2016
- Born: May 14, 1944; Altoona, Pennsylvania, U.S.
- Died: August 15, 2021 (aged 77); Santa Monica, California, U.S.
- Awards: David H. Russell Award; AERA Distinguished Lectureship; UCLA's Distinguished Teaching Award; Guggenheim Fellowship; University of Louisville Grawemeyer Award in Education; Commonwealth Club of California Award

Academic background
- Education: Loyola University (B.A.); University of Southern California (M.S.); UCLA (M.A. and Ph.D.)

Academic work
- Main interests: Education
- Notable works: Lives on the Boundary

Mike Rose (May 14, 1944 – August 15, 2021) was an American scholar of education who studied literacy and the struggles of working-class America. He was a Research Professor of Social Research Methodology in the UCLA Graduate School of Education and Information Studies.

== Early life ==
Rose was born in Altoona, Pennsylvania, on May 14, 1944, the son of Italian immigrants Rose (née Meraglio) and Tommy Rose. At the age of seven, he moved with his family to a working-class neighborhood in South Los Angeles. He drifted uneventfully through most of his early education. Through a mix up in test scores with another student with the same surname, he was placed in a vocational education track upon entering high school at Our Lady of Mercy. After several years, a teacher looked at his records and discovered that Rose had been misplaced in the vocational track.

Rose was moved out of the vocational track and began the following school year in the college prep track. Once there, a dedicated English teacher during his senior year named Jack MacFarland pushed Rose to re-evaluate himself and helped him get admitted as a probationary student to Loyola University. This change in perspective proved to be a turning point for Rose, who would then go on to earn a bachelor's degree from Loyola University and win a graduate fellowship in English at UCLA. He wrote a memoir essay about his awakening as a reader and writer entitled "I Just Wanna Be Average".

== Teaching ==
In time, Rose became disaffected with academia and left graduate study to embark on a series of jobs teaching writing to underprivileged and underprepared students in inner-city Los Angeles. Over the next several years, Rose would teach everything from elementary writing to basic adult literacy. In time, Rose accepted a position as a director at UCLA's tutoring center where he was instrumental in shaping tutor training and policy. In 1981, Rose received his PhD in education from UCLA and in 1994 was hired as a faculty member in the Graduate School of Education and Information Studies. Rose taught for nearly forty years.

== Contributions to education ==
One of Rose's most significant contributions was his reevaluation of remedial writers. In his bestselling book, Lives on the Boundary, he argued that remedial students lack literacy skills not through a shortage of intelligence but because of a history of poor education and a lack of supportive social and economic conditions. He challenged educators to have increased confidence in such students and called for greater equality in educational opportunities. In addition, his work questioned prevailing methods of teaching literacy to unprepared students.

Rose questioned the effectiveness of "skill and drill" curricula that primarily focused on grammar and its usage. Instead, he argued that basic writers should be pushed to engage in a meaningful composition that draws on critical thinking. He wrote widely on the importance of public education in a democracy and the need for a more humane philosophy of education that goes beyond economic benefit and learning as measured by standardized test scores.

Later in life, Rose wrote about the intelligence involved in doing blue-collar work like that of a waiter, plumber, and welder, and called into question the standard definitions of intelligence, the way people define "skilled" work, and the separation of the school curriculum into the "vocational" and the "academic".

== Awards ==
Rose's research has been widely recognized, and he was the recipient of the National Council of Teachers of English David H. Russell Award for Distinguished Research in the Teaching of English, the American Educational Research Association's Distinguished Lectureship, UCLA's Distinguished Teaching Award, a Guggenheim Fellowship, the University of Louisville Grawemeyer Award in Education, and the Commonwealth Club of California Award for Literary Excellence in Nonfiction.

== Death ==
Following a cerebral hemorrhage, Rose died at the age of 77 at his home in Santa Monica, California, on August 15, 2021.

== Books ==
- Writer's Block: The Cognitive Dimension (1984)—study exploring thought patterns that hinder composition
- When a Writer Can't Write: Studies in Writer's Block and Other Composing Problems (1985)—an examination of the social and cognitive barriers that impede writing
- Perspectives on Literacy, editor, with Eugene R. Kintgen and Barry M. Kroll (1988)—a collection of essays focused on writing and its larger dimensions
- Lives on the Boundary (1989)—a semi-autobiographical account detailing the struggles and challenges of educationally underprepared students
- Possible Lives: The Promise of Public Education in America (1995)—an exploration into the problems and potential of education in America
- Critical Strategies for Academic Thinking and Writing, with Malcolm Kiniry (Third Edition, 1997)—a college textbook that outlines six effective strategies for thinking and writing
- Literacy: A Critical Sourcebook, with Ellen Cushman, Barry Kroll, and Eugene R. Kintgen (2001)—a collection of essays exploring the use and acquisition of reading and writing
- The Mind At Work: Valuing the Intelligence of the American Worker (2004)—a study exploring the complex thinking involved in common labor
- An Open Language: Selected Writing on Literacy, Learning, and Opportunity (2006)—a collection of essays exploring various subjects on education
- Why School?: Reclaiming Education for All of Us (2009)—a collection of essays on the purpose of education
- Back to School: Why Everyone Deserves a Second Chance at Education (2012) 09876
