= Doris Entwisle =

American sociologist (born 1924)

- Citizenship: United States of America
- Occupation: Professor of Sociology
- Spouse: George Entwisle
- Awards: SRCD Award for Distinguished Scientific Contributions to Child Development Fellow of the American Educational Research Association Fellow of John Simon Guggenheim Memorial Foundation

Academic background
- Education: University of Massachusetts (B.S.) Brown University (M.S.) Johns Hopkins University (Ph.D.)

Academic work
- Discipline: Sociology Education
- Sub-discipline: Developmental Psychology
- Institutions: Johns Hopkins University

Doris R. Entwisle (1924–2013) was an educational sociologist known for her research on the impact of sociological factors on academic achievement, notably the longitudinal Beginning School Studies conducted in Baltimore, MD. She held the position of professor of sociology and engineering studies at Johns Hopkins University.

Entwisle was awarded the Senior Distinguished Contributions Award by Society for Research in Child Development in 1997. She was named a Fellow of the John Simon Guggenheim Memorial Foundation in 1976 and the American Educational Research Association in 2008.

The Long Shadow: Family Background, Disadvantaged Urban Youth, and the Transition to Adulthood, co-authored by Entwisle, Karl Alexander and Linda Olson, received the Grawemeyer Award in Education from the University of Louisville in 2015. This book detailed how socioeconomic factors shaped the life outcomes of 800 Baltimore youths. One major finding was that white youth held an advantage over black youth when it came to employment, even when having similar educational backgrounds.

== Biography ==
Entwisle earned her bachelor's degree in 1945 from the University of Massachusetts Amherst and a master's degree in psychology from Brown University in 1946. In between her graduate degrees, she worked closely with Dr. Charles Frederick Mosteller, the founding chairman of the statistics department at Harvard University on a variety of social science studies before pursuing her doctoral degree at Johns Hopkins University.

In 1975, she was named editor of the academic journal, Sociology of Education. To honor her contributions, the American Sociological Association has given The Doris Entwisle Award to outstanding researchers in the field every two years since 2015.

Outside her academic career, she also founded the Harvey Lake Watershed Association and served as the annual coordinator for their host program until 2012.

== Research ==
Entwisle's early work focused on children's language development. In her research on word associations, she found that children's responses to high-frequency words shifted from a syntagmatic base to a paradigmatic base at the age of 6 and 8. Syntagmatic associations link words that co-occur in related contexts, such as dog and bone, whereas paradigmatic associations link words from the same taxonomic category, such as collie and poodle. A follow-up study further revealed that the shift occurred later for verbs and adverbs than for nouns.

Entwisle's research on the impact of sociological and familial factors on school readiness and academic achievement challenged mainstream ideas about school performance at the time. Her long-time collaboration with Karl L. Alexander, the Beginning School Studies, has yielded fruitful results on factors shaping life outcomes for disadvantaged youth. Their 1988 paper, "Achievement in the First 2 Years of School: Patterns and Processes" showed that the first year of school is key in shaping subsequent achievement trajectory, highlighting the importance of understanding differences in school readiness. They also found that the summer learning loss, or the break in educational gains that occurs in the summer, predicted an achievement gap between youth of low vs. high socioeconomic status in 9th grade. Their research on predictors of dropping out also found a series of personal, familial factors that influence drop-out rate independent of sociodemographic factors, such as parent's attitudes, stressful family changes, and children's personal resources. Based on these findings, the authors developed a life-course perspective on dropping out, viewing it as a culminating effect of personal and familial resources.

== Books ==
- Entwisle, D.R. (1966). Word Associations of Young Children. The Johns Hopkins University Press. ISBN 9780801801891
- Entwisle, D. R., & Hayduk, L. A. (1978). Too Great Expectations: The Academic Outlook of Young Children. The Johns Hopkins University Press. ISBN 0801819865
- Entwisle, D. R., & Doering, S. G. (1981). The First Birth, A Family Turning Point. The Johns Hopkins University Press. ISBN 0801824087
- Alexander, K. L., Entwisle, D. R., & Dauber, S. L. (2003). On the Success of Failure: A Reassessment of the Effects of Retention in the Primary School Grades. Cambridge University Press. ISBN 0521790646
- Alexander, K. L., Entwisle, D.R., & Olson, L. (2014). The Long Shadow: Family Background, Disadvantaged Urban Youth, and the Transition to Adulthood. Russell Sage Foundation. ISBN 9780871540331
- Entwisle, D.R., Alexander, K. & Olson, L. (2018). Children, Schools and Inequality. Routledge by Taylor & Francis. ISBN 9780813366517

== Representative papers ==
- Entwisle, D.R. & Alexander, K. & Cadigan, D. & Pallas, A. (1987). The schooling process in first grade: Two samples a decade apart. American Educational Research Journal, 23, 587–613.
- Alexander, K. L., Entwisle, D. R., Blyth, D. A., & McAdoo, H. P. (1988). Achievement in the First 2 Years of School: Patterns and Processes. Monographs of the Society for Research in Child Development, 53(2), i–157.
- Alexander, K. L., Entwisle, D. R., & Horsey, C. S. (1997). From First Grade Forward: Early Foundations of High School Dropout. Sociology of Education, 70(2), 87–107.
- Alexander, K. L., Entwisle, D. R., & Olson, L. S. (2007). Lasting Consequences of the Summer Learning Gap. American Sociological Review, 72(2), 167–180.
