= Deborah Brandt =

American academic (born 1951)

Deborah L. Brandt (born 1951) is an American academic who is professor emerita of English at the University of Wisconsin–Madison.

== Education and awards ==
Deborah Brandt earned her B.A. from Rutgers University in 1974 and her Ph.D. from Indiana University Bloomington in 1983, after she worked for the University of Wisconsin–Madison she retired in 2010. Although she had published more than two dozen articles and book chapters she is also known for her Literacy in American Lives, for which she was able to win three awards which were: the Modern Language Association's Mina P. Shaughnessy Prize (2002), the Grawemeyer Award (2003), and the Conference on College Composition and Communication’s Outstanding Book Award (2003). Her text Literacy as Involvement: The Acts of Writers, Readers, and Texts (Southern Illinois UP, 1990) won the 1992 David H. Russell Award for Distinguished Research from the National Council of Teachers of English.

She was also awarded two fellowships, one with the American Council of Learned Societies in 1986 and the other one was with the National Research Council in 1998, for which she was a Visiting Scholar at the United States Department of Education. Brandt is the 2017 winner of the Conference for College Composition and Communication (CCCC) Exemplar Award.

== Research focus ==
Brandt's research focuses on the social contexts of mass literacy and literacy learning; and on large-scale, structural forces that shape individuals' access to literacy.

In Literacy in American Lives Brandt "explains how generations of Americans have made sense of and coped with increased pressure to improve their ability to read and write." By analyzing the literacy histories of hundreds of Americans from all walks of life, Brandt documents the effects that the changing economic, political, and sociocultural conditions in American society have had on literacy acquisition and usage, from the 1900s to the present day. In this text, she puts forward the notion of "Sponsors of Literacy,"; she writes: "Sponsors, as I have come to think of them, are any agents, local or distant, concrete or abstract, who enable, support, teach, or model, as well as recruit, regulate, suppress, or withhold literacy -- and gain advantage by it in some way." Through the concept of sponsorship, Brandt argues for attention to the socioeconomic and contextual forces that grant access to literate resources to some and deny it to others. In 2015, Brandt also published The Rise of Writing: Redefining Mass Literacy, which examines and navigates writing in the workplace. It argues that many Americans now actually write more than they read.

== Public service ==
The John Simon Guggenheim Memorial Foundation says that "the impact of her work has been felt well beyond the borders of the University of Wisconsin campus."

Brandt worked as a research associate at the National Research Center on English Learning and Achievement (1996–2002), a consultant for the National Assessment of Adult Literacy (2005–07), and with the National Writing Project. Her ongoing efforts in support of social justice and educational opportunity in the Madison, Wisconsin community have been recognized by the NAACP's W.E.B. DuBois Advocate Award (2001) and two nominations by the Madison Urban League for the city's Martin Luther King Humanitarian Award for her work with Madison middle-school students.
