= Educational Computing Organization of Ontario =

The Educational Computing Organization of Ontario (ECOO) is a non-profit group established in 1979 for the purpose of facilitating the integration of new computing technology into the educational curriculum.

== ECOO conference ==
Each year ECOO hosts a conference in November. In 2008, the ECOO conference moved to the Sheraton Parkway North Hotel and Suites in Richmond Hill. In 2013, the conference moved to Niagara Falls. Bring IT Together was held October 23–25 at the Scotiabank Convention Centre.

A variety of educators and administrators attend this three-day conference. Presenters include industry professionals, instructional leaders and higher education as well as many school board teachers. Some representative teachers come from school boards such as the TDSB Toronto District School Board, York Region District School Board YRDSB York Region and the Kawartha Pine Ridge District School Board to name a few. As an addition to each conference, ECOO publishes a Proceedings, summarizing the presentations and other activities during that year's conference.

== Bylaw changes ==
According to the organization's main web site, proposed bylaw changes were voted in May 2009. The 2008-09 Board of Directors had put together a series of bylaw changes designed to help ensure the ongoing health and flexibility of the organization. Attendees of the 2008 Conference were considered voting members and were invited to participate, either in person or by proxy.

== Computer Programming Contests ==
ECOO organizes programming contests for Ontario secondary school students. The ECOO contests consist of three parts:

=== Boardwide Programming Contest ===
It is distributed by email to convenors of school boards. The school boards use this contest to select the teams that will represent them in the Regional Programming Contest. The maximum number of teams that the school boards can send depend on the size of the school boards.

=== Regional Programming Contest ===
It is held at several locations across Ontario. These contests are used to determine the teams that will represent their regions to participate in the Final Programming Contest.

=== Final Programming Contest ===
The top twenty teams meet at a location to compete in this contest to determine the top three teams for awards.

== Publications ==
The organization publishes a magazine titled Output which is delivered to members. In 1994 the organization presented a report to the Ontario Royal Commission on Learning.
