= David Dunning =

American social psychologist (born 1960)

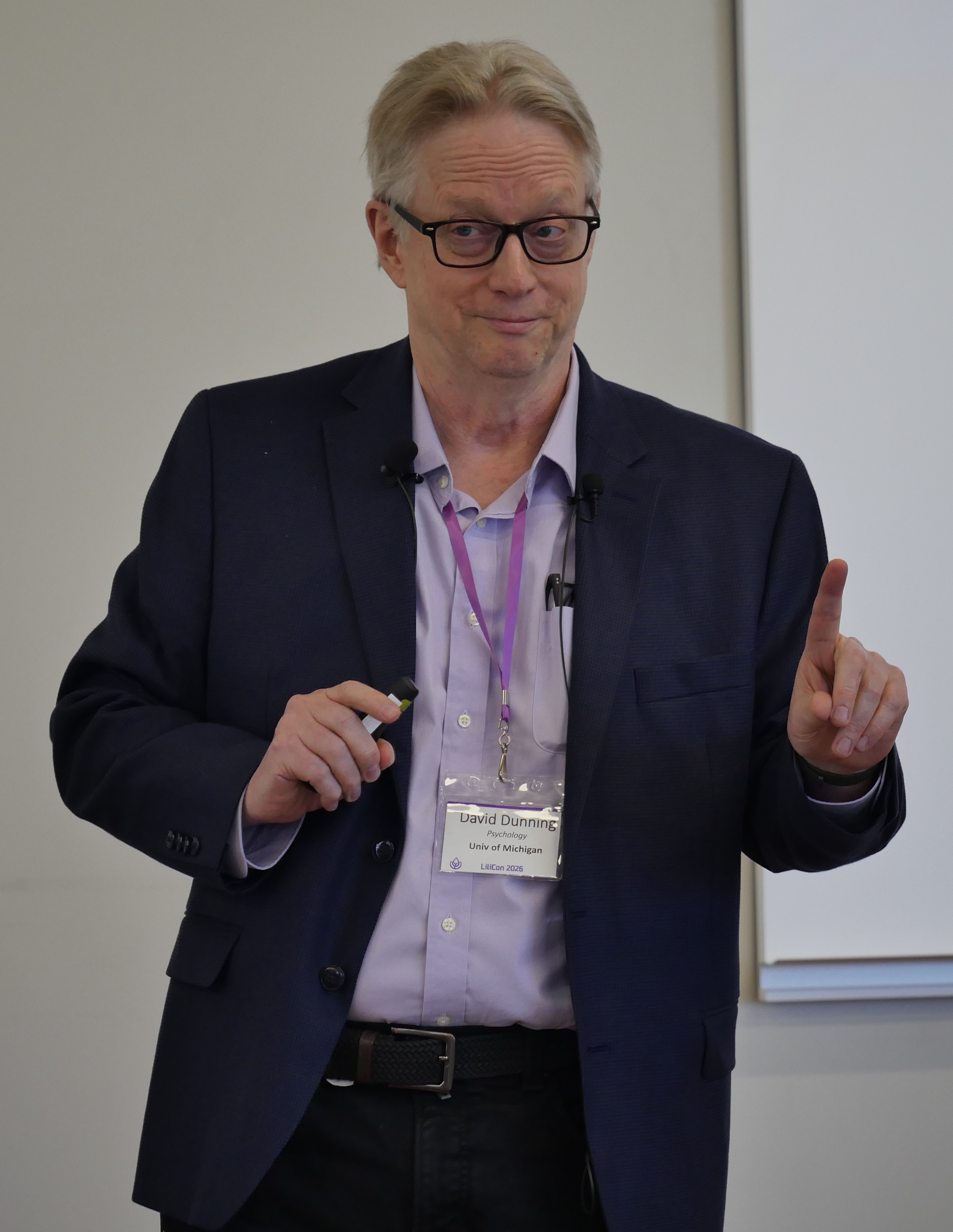
- David Dunning at LiliCon 2026
- Born: 1960 (age 65–66); United States
- Education: Michigan State University (BA); Stanford University (PhD)
- Occupations: Psychologist, professor
- Known for: Dunning–Kruger effect
- Scientific career
- Workplaces: University of Michigan; Cornell University
- Thesis: Situational construal and sources of social judgment (1986)
- Doctoral advisor: Lee Ross
- Doctoral students: Emily Balcetis

David Alan Dunning (born 1960) is an American social psychologist and professor of psychology at the University of Michigan. He is a retired professor of psychology at Cornell University.

== Education ==
He received his B.A. from Michigan State University in 1982 and a Ph.D. from Stanford University in 1986, both in psychology.

== Research ==
Dunning has published more than 80 peer-reviewed papers, book chapters, and commentaries. He is well known for co-authoring a 1999 study with graduate student Justin Kruger after reading about the 1995 Greater Pittsburgh bank robberies in which the perpetrators wore lemon juice instead of masks, thinking it would make them invisible to security cameras. This study showed that people who performed the lowest at certain tasks, such as judging humor, grammar, and logic, significantly overestimated how good they were at these tasks. This study has since given rise to what is known as the Dunning–Kruger effect, a cognitive bias in which people mistakenly assess their cognitive ability as greater than it is. The study also found that people who performed slightly above average at identifying how funny a given joke was tended to be the most accurate at assessing how good they were at the assigned tasks, and that those who performed the best tended to think they performed only slightly above average. In 2012, Dunning told Ars Technica that he "thought the paper would never be published" and that he was "struck just with how long and how much this idea has gone viral in so many areas."

== Positions ==
Dunning is the executive officer of the Society for Personality and Social Psychology and the Foundation for Personality and Social Psychology. He has also served as an associate editor of the Journal of Personality and Social Psychology.

== Awards ==
In 2021, Dunning was listed by Stanford University as being in the world's top 2% most cited psychological scientists.

In 2023, he was awarded the Grawemeyer Award in Psychology.

== See also ==
- List of Ig Nobel Prize winners
