= Justin Kruger =

American social psychologist

- Born: California, U.S.
- Education: Santa Clara University (BS); Cornell University (PhD)
- Occupations: Psychologist, professor
- Known for: Dunning–Kruger effect
- Scientific career
- Fields: Psychology
- Thesis: Egocentrism in self and social judgment (1999)
- Doctoral advisor: Thomas Gilovich

Justin S. Kruger is an American social psychologist and former professor at the New York University Stern School of Business He is the 2023 co-recipient of the Grawemeyer Award in Psychology.

== Education ==
Kruger received a Bachelor of Science (B.S.) in psychology from Santa Clara University in 1993, and spent his junior year there at Durham University. He then received his PhD in social psychology from Cornell University in 1999.

== Research ==
Kruger is known for co-authoring a 1999 study with David Dunning.

The Dunning-Kruger effect, a cognitive bias, suggests that poor performers often overestimate their abilities, while skilled individuals tend to underestimate their abilities. This study showed that people who performed in the lowest at certain tasks, such as judging humor, grammar, and logic, significantly overestimated how good they were at these tasks. This study has since given rise to what is known as the Dunning–Kruger effect, a form of cognitive bias where persons with low ability in a particular task experience a sense of illusory superiority. The study also found that people who performed slightly above average at identifying how funny a given joke was tended to be the most accurate at assessing how good they were at the assigned tasks, and that those who performed the best tended to think they performed only slightly above average.

== See also ==
- List of Ig Nobel Prize winners
