= Emily Balcetis =

Social psychologist

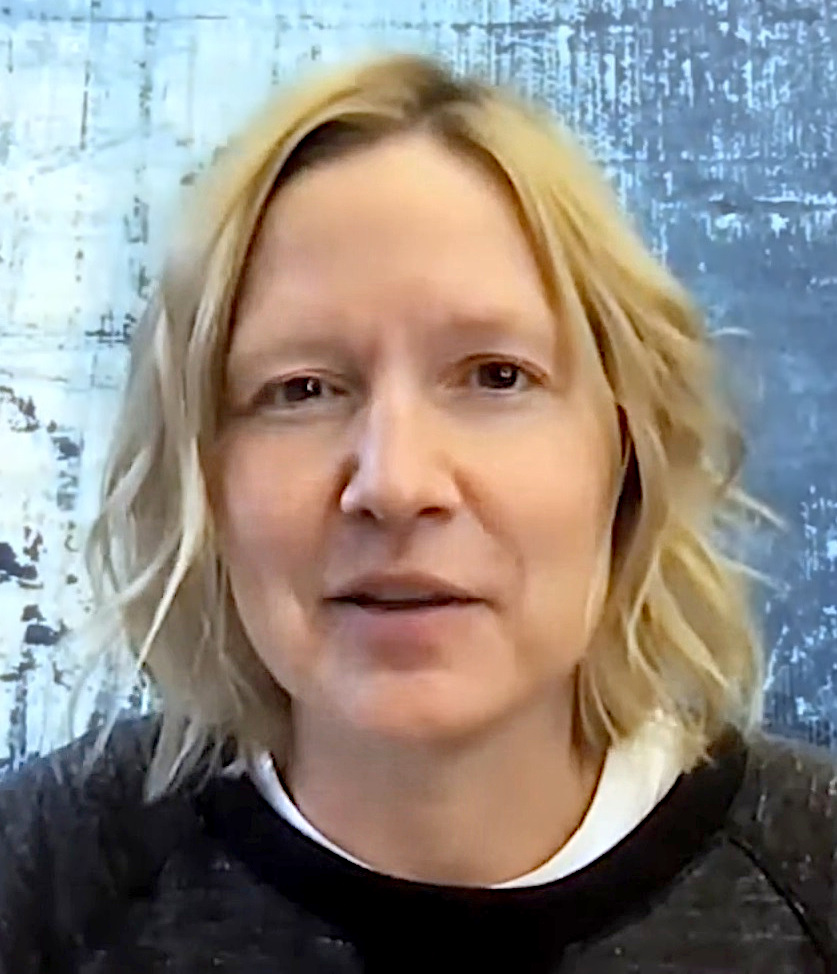
- Balcetis in 2022
- Scientific career
- Fields: Social psychology
- Institutions: New York University
- Thesis: Motivated visual perception: how we see what we want to see (2006)
- Doctoral advisor: David Dunning
- Website: www.psych.nyu.edu/balcetis/

Emily E. Balcetis is an American social psychologist and Associate Professor of Psychology at New York University. Her research focuses on people's perception of world and how their motivations, goals, and emotions influence it, especially with regards to visual perception.

== Biography ==
Balcetis received a B.A. in psychology and a B.F.A. in music performance from the University of Nebraska at Kearney in 2001. She subsequently attended Cornell University and obtained her Ph.D. in Social Psychology in 2006. Balcetis joined the faculty of New York University in 2006 and was recipient of the NYU College of Arts and Sciences Golden Dozen Teaching Award in 2014. Balcetis is co-editor of the volume, Social Psychology of Visual Perception, with G. Daniel Lassiter.

Balcetis was a recipient of the SAGE Young Scholars Award from the Foundation for Personality and Social Psychology in 2011. In 2016, she received the International Society for Self and Identity Outstanding Early Career Award and the Early Career Impact Award from the Federation of Associations in Behavioral & Brain Sciences (FABBS). Her co-authored paper with David Dunning titled Considering the Situation: Why People are Better Social Psychologists than Self-Psychologists was named Best Paper by the International Society for Self and Identity in 2011.

== Research ==
Building on ideas first proposed by Jerome Bruner and Cecile Goodman in 1947, Balcetis has explored how mental and motivational states influence how visual stimuli are perceived and responded to. Her research article with David Dunning Cognitive Dissonance and the Perception of Natural Environments examined the way in which "motivation to resolve cognitive dissonance affects the visual perception of physical environments." Cognitive dissonance occurs when an individual finds themselves in a situation that is contradictory to their beliefs, logic, behavior, and attitudes. To resolve the conflict and resume harmony the individual must change themselves or their views. In Balcetis and Dunning's study, participants were given the choice of performing a task that induced cognitive dissonance, such as pushing themselves up a hill while kneeling on a skateboard. After choosing to complete this task (but prior to completing it), participants perceived the slope of the hill to be less steep than a control group who were never given the choice of completing the skateboard task. The results of this study suggest that visual perception may be altered by the process of decision making.

== Book ==
- Clearer, Closer, Better: How Successful People See the World (Ballantine, 2020, ISBN 9781524796464)

== Selected articles ==
- Balcetis, E., & Dunning, D. (2006). See what you want to see: motivational influences on visual perception. Journal of Personality and Social Psychology, 91(4), 612–625.
- Balcetis, E., & Dunning, D. (2010). Wishful seeing: More desired objects are seen as closer. Psychological Science, 21(1), 147–152.
- Balcetis, E., & Dunning, D. (2007). Cognitive dissonance and the perception of natural environments. Psychological Science, 18(10), 917–921.
