= Michael Fullan =

Canadian academic (born 1940)

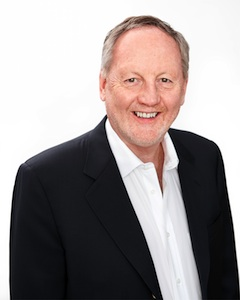
- Born: 1940 (age 85–86); Toronto, Ontario, Canada
- Education: University of Toronto
- Known for: Educational research
- Website: www.michaelfullan.ca

Michael Fullan is a Canadian educational researcher and former dean of the Ontario Institute for Studies in Education (OISE). He is noted for his expertise on educational reform, and has consulted to school districts, teacher groups, research institutes, and governments.

== Early life and career ==
Fullan was born in Toronto, Ontario. He earned a doctorate in sociology in 1969 from the University of Toronto, and then worked as a graduate teacher, researcher, and leader of in-service programs.

Fullan was appointed dean of the University of Toronto's Faculty of Education (FEUT) in 1988, and remained dean following FEUT's amalgamation with the Ontario Institute for Studies in Education in 1996. He stepped down in 2003, and serves now as Professor Emeritus.

Fullan served as special policy adviser in education to the Premier of Ontario from 2004 to 2013.

In March 2013, Fullan met with California governor Jerry Brown to discuss the possibility of pursuing educational reforms in California similar to those in Ontario.

== Research ==
In 1998, Fullan and British educator Andy Hargreaves co-authored What's Worth Fighting for in Education? The central theme was that teacher quality and morale were fundamental to pupil learning and well-being. Strategies for empowering teachers were put forth.

Fullan set out the demands on school principals in What's Worth Fighting for in the Principalship? (1997), together with strategies for improving school effectiveness.<

The Moral Imperative of School Leadership (2003) examined the moral purpose of educational leadership and the role principals play in transforming schools.

Fullan addressed the topic of school change in Motion Leadership (2010), and outlined ways to connect peers to purpose, gain trust, overcome resistance, and provide transparency.

== Publications ==
=== Books ===
- Change Forces: Probing the Depths of Educational Reform (1992)
- What's Worth Fighting for in Your School? (1996)
- What's Worth Fighting for in the Principalship? (1997)
- What's Worth Fighting for Out There? (1998)
- Change Forces: The Sequel (1999)
- The New Meaning of Educational Change (2001)
- Leading in a Culture of Change (2001)
- The Moral Imperative of School Leadership (2003)
- Change Forces with a Vengeance (2003)
- Education in Motion: Leading in a Culture of Change (2003)
- Leadership & Sustainability: System Thinkers in Action (2005)
- Breakthrough (2006)
- Learning Places: A Field Guide for Improving the Context of Schooling (2006)
- Turnaround Leadership (2006)
- The New Meaning of Educational Change (Fourth Edition) (2007)
- What's Worth Fighting for in the Principalship? (Second Edition) (2008)
- Change Wars (2008)
- The Six Secrets of Change: What the Best Leaders Do to Help Their Organizations Survive and Thrive (2008)
- Realization: The Change Imperative for Deepening District-Wide Reform (2009)
- Turnaround Leadership for Higher Education (2009)
- The Challenge of Change: Start School Improvement Now! (2009)
- All Systems Go: The Change Imperative for Whole System Reform (2010)
- Motion Leadership: The Skinny on Becoming Change Savvy (2010)
- The Moral Imperative Realized (2011)
- Change Leader: Learning to Do What Matters Most (2011)
- Motion Leadership in Action: More Skinny on Becoming Change Savvy (2012)
- Professional Capital (2012)
- Stratosphere: Integrating Technology, Pedagogy, and Change Knowledge (2012)
- Putting Faces on the Data (2012)
- Cultures Built to Last: Systemic PLCs at Work (2013)
- The Principal: Three Keys to Maximizing Impact (2014)
- Coherence: The Right Drivers in Action for Schools, Districts, and Systems (2015)
- Indelible Leadership (2016)
- Deep Learning: Engage the World Change the World (2018)
- Nuance: Why Some Leaders Succeed and Others Fail (2018)
- Dive into Deep Learning: Tools for Engagement (2019)

== Honours ==
Fullan holds honorary doctorates from Nipissing University in Canada, the Education University of Hong Kong, the University of Leicester in England, Duquesne University in Pennsylvania, and the University of Edinburgh in Scotland.

In 2012, he was named an Officer of the Order of Canada "for his achievements in the field of education reform, as a scholar, teacher, writer and adviser to governments in Canada and abroad."
