= Andy Hargreaves (academic) =

British academic

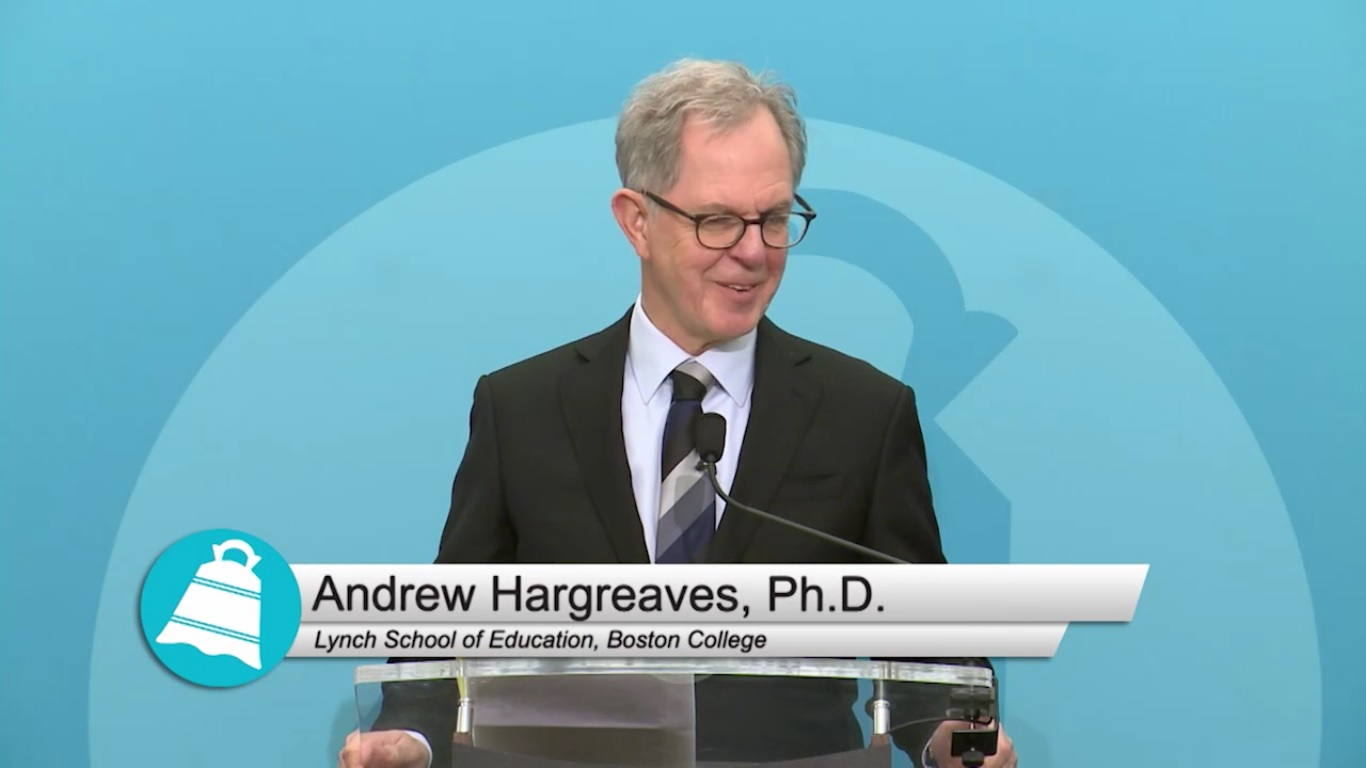
- Born: 13 February 1951 (age 74)

Andrew Hargreaves (born 13 February 1951) is visiting professor at the University of Ottawa and research professor at Boston College.

== Early life ==
Hargreaves grew up in the small Lancashire textile and engineering town of Accrington in England, home to football club Accrington Stanley. In 2002, he laid the foundation stone for the new building at his old primary school, Spring Hill Community Primary School, with his former teacher, Mary Hindle. The youngest of three brothers, he was the first in his extended family history to enter higher education, studying sociology at Sheffield University.

== Academic career ==
Hargreaves completed his PhD in Sociology at the University of Leeds in England, and lectured in a number of English universities, including Oxford, until in 1987 he moved to the Ontario Institute for Studies in Education in Canada, where he co-founded and directed the International Center for Educational Change. From 2002–2018 he was the Thomas More Brennan Chair in Education at Boston College, until he returned to Canada to become Visiting Professor at the University of Ottawa.

Hargreaves has published more than 30 books that have been translated into a dozen languages. He has won ten Outstanding Writing Awards, including two 2025 Society of Professors of Education Book Awards, one with Dennis Shirley as well as the 2015 Grawemeyer Award with Michael Fullan.

Hargreaves' books include:

- The Making of an Educator: Living and Learning Through the Great Education Shift (2025)
- Leadership from the Middle: The Beating Heart of Educational Change (2024)
- The Age of Identity: Who Do Our Kids Think they are and How Do We Help Them Belong? (with Dennis Shirley, 2023)
- Well-being in Schools: Three Forces that Will Uplift Your Students in a Volatile World (2022)
- Five Paths of Student Engagement (2021)
- Moving: A Memoir of Education and Social Mobility
- Collaborative Professionalism: When Teaching Together Means Learning for All (with Michael O’Connor)

== Honours and memberships ==
Andy Hargreaves is an elected member of the National Academy of Education in the US, and a member of the Royal Society of Arts in the UK. He holds Honorary Doctorates from Uppsala University in Sweden, the Education University of Hong Kong, and the University of Greater Manchester.

== Personal life ==
Hargreaves has been married for over 50 years to Pauline Hargreaves, a retired school administrator. They have two children – Stuart, an Associate Professor in Law at the Chinese University of Hong Kong, and Lucy, a Canadian entrepreneur and former Canadian federal government Chief of Staff to Mona Fortier (2017–21).

Hargreaves is a long-distance hiker, and a life-long supporter of Burnley Football Club.
