= Self-policing =

Self-policing is another term for self-governance, a group or community autonomously managing their own affairs.

Self-policing may also refer to:

- Emotional self-regulation
- Industry self-regulation
- Self-control, in sociology / psychology
- Self-regulatory organizations, in business and finance
