= Positive outcome bias =

Positive outcome bias may refer to:

- Publication bias, the tendency for researchers to publish research which had a positive outcome. "Positive" in this sense means "eventful" as opposed to "uneventful"
- Unrealistic optimism, a bias in prediction in which people overestimate the probability of good things happening to them. "Positive" in this sense means "good" as opposed to "bad" feelings
