= Positive illusions =

Unrealistically favorable attitudes

Positive illusions are unrealistically favorable attitudes that people have towards themselves or to people that are close to them. Positive illusions are a form of self-deception or self-enhancement that feel good, maintain self-esteem, or avoid discomfort, at least in the short term. There are three general forms: inflated assessment of one's own abilities, unrealistic optimism about the future, and an illusion of control. The term "positive illusions" originates in a 1988 paper by Shelley E. Taylor and Jonathon D. Brown. Taylor and Brown's model of mental health maintains that certain positive illusions are highly prevalent in normal thought and predictive of criteria traditionally associated with mental health.

There are controversies about the extent to which people reliably demonstrate positive illusions, as well as whether these illusions are beneficial to the people who have them.

== Types ==
In the above-average effect, people regard themselves more positively than they regard others and less negatively than others regard them. Positive attributes are judged to be more descriptive of themselves than of an average person, whereas negative ones are judged to be less descriptive of themselves than of an average person. Despite the fact that it is statistically impossible for most people to be superior to their peers, rather than being equally aware of ones strengths and weaknesses, people are more aware of their strengths and not very aware of their weaknesses. This effect has been widely recognized across traits and abilities including the different abilities of driving, parenting, leadership, teaching, ethics, and general health. This effect is also evident in memory; most people also tend to perceive their ability to remember as better than it actually is.

The illusion of control is an exaggerated assessment of the individual's personal control over environmental circumstances such as the roll of dice or flip of coin.

Optimism bias is a tendency for people to overestimate their likelihood of experiencing a wide variety of pleasant events, such as enjoying their first job or having a gifted child, and somewhat underestimate their risk of succumbing to negative events, such as getting divorced or falling victim to a chronic disease. This illusory nature of optimism is also evident in peoples' under-estimation of the time taken for a variety of tasks.

== Origins ==
Like many forms of human perception, self-perception is prone to illusion. Positive illusions have been commonly understood as one of the apparent effects of self-enhancement, a desire to maximize the positivity of one's self-views and a function of boosting self-esteem. It might be due to the desire to see oneself more favorably relative to one's peers. These kinds of self-serving attributions seemed to be displayed by positive self-viewers only. In fact, the negative-viewers were found to display the opposite pattern. Research suggests that there may be some genetic contributions to the ability of developing positive illusions. Early environment also plays an important role, in which people are more able to develop these positive beliefs in nurturing environments than in harsh ones.

Alternative explanations involve dimensions like the easiness and commonness of the tasks. In addition, tasks that shifted attention from the self to the comparative target would stop people overly optimising.

The cultural prevalence also has a significant role in positive illusions. Although it is easy to document positive illusions in individualistic Western cultures, people in collectivist East Asian cultures are much less likely to self-enhance and, indeed, are often self-effacing instead.

Most studies find that people tend to have inflated views of themselves. The research indicates that the relationship between people's self-evaluations and objective assessments is relatively weak. One explanation for this is that most people only have mild positive illusions.

However, according to recent studies there is evidence that there are significant individual differences between the strength of positive illusions people have. Therefore, some people may have extremely inflated self-views, some mild and some very little and when examined across a population this effect appears weak.

== Benefits and liabilities ==
Positive illusions can have advantages and disadvantages for the individual, and there is a controversy over whether they are evolutionarily adaptive. The illusions may have direct health benefits by helping the person cope with stress, or by promoting work towards success. On the other hand, unrealistically positive expectations may prevent people from taking sensible preventive action for medical risks. Research in 2001 provided evidence that people who have positive illusions may have both short term benefits and long term costs. Specifically, self-enhancement is not correlated with academic success or graduation rates in college.

=== Mental health ===
Taylor and Brown's Social Psychological Model of mental health has assumed that positive beliefs would be tied to psychological well-being, and that positive self-evaluations, even unrealistic, would promote good mental health. The reference to well-being here means the ability to feel good about oneself, to be creative and/or productive in one's work, to form satisfying relationships with other people and to effectively combat stress when necessary. Positive illusions are particularly useful for helping people to get through major stressful events or traumas, such as life-threatening illnesses or serious accidents. People who are able to develop or maintain their positive beliefs in the face of these potential setbacks tend to cope more successfully with them, and show less psychological distress than those less able. For example, psychological research shows that cancer survivors often report a higher quality of life than people who have never had cancer at all. This could be physiologically protective because they have been able to use the traumatic experience to evoke an increased sense of meaning and purpose. This relates to the concept of psychological resilience or an individual's ability to cope with challenges and stress. Self-enhancing was found to be correlated with resilience in the face of the 9/11 tragedy among participants either in or near the towers.

People also hold positive illusions because such beliefs often enhance their productivity and persistence with tasks on which they might otherwise give up. When people believe they can achieve a difficult goal, this expectation often creates a sense of energy and excitement, resulting in more progress than would otherwise have been the case.

Positive illusions can be argued to be adaptive because they enable people to feel hopeful in the face of uncontrollable risks.

In addition, there seems to be a relationship between illusions and positive mood. Studies have found that the direction of this relationship is that positive illusions cause positive mood states.

However, more recent findings found that all forms of illusion, positive or not, were associated with more depressive symptoms and various other studies reject the link between positive illusions and mental health, well-being or life satisfaction, maintaining that accurate perception of reality is compatible with happiness.

When studying the link between self-esteem and positive illusions, Compton (1992) identified a group which possessed high self-esteem without positive illusions, and that these individuals weren't depressed, neurotic, psychotic, maladjusted nor personality disordered, thus concluding that positive illusions aren't necessary for high self-esteem. Compared to the group with positive illusions and high self-esteem, the nonillusional group with high self-esteem was higher on self-criticism and personality integration and lower on psychoticism.

A meta-analysis of 118 studies including 7013 subjects found that slightly more studies supported the idea of depressive realism, but these studies were poorer in quality, used non-clinical samples, were more readily generalized, used self-reports instead of interviews and used attentional bias or judgment of contingency as a method of measuring depressive realism, as methods such as recall of feedback and evaluation of performance showed results counter to depressive realism.

Another recent meta-analysis supports Taylor and Browns central claim. Its results indicate that different forms of self-enhancement are positively linked to personal adjustment (high subjective well-being and low depressiveness). Self-enhancement was not only linked to self-ratings of personal adjustment, but also to adjustment ratings made by informants (including clinical experts). Furthermore, self-enhancement was also a longitudinal predictor of personal adjustment.

=== Physical health ===
Apart from having better psychological adjustment with more active coping, the ability to develop and sustain positive beliefs in the face of setbacks has its health benefits. Research with men who had the HIV virus, or already diagnosed with AIDS has shown that those who hold unrealistically positive assessments of their abilities to control their health conditions take longer to develop symptoms, experience a slower course of illness, as well as other positive cognitive outcomes, such as acceptance of the loss.

=== Potential liabilities ===
There are several potential risks that may arise if people hold positive illusions about their personal qualities and likely outcomes. First of all, they might set themselves up for unpleasant surprises for which they are ill-prepared when their overly optimistic beliefs are disconfirmed. They may also have to tackle the consequences thereafter. However, research suggests that, for the most part, these adverse outcomes do not occur. People's beliefs are more realistic at times when realism serves them particularly well: for example, when initially making plans; when accountability is likely or following negative feedback from the environment. Following a setback or failure, all is still not lost, as people's overly positive beliefs may be used again in a new undertaking.

A second risk is that people who hold positive illusions will set goals, or undertake courses of actions which are more likely to produce failure than success. This concern appears to be largely without basis. Research shows that when people are deliberating future courses of actions for themselves, such as whether to take a particular job or go to graduate school, their perceptions are fairly realistic, but they can become overly optimistic when they turn to implementing their plans. Although there is no guarantee that one's realistic prediction would turn out to be accurate, the shift from realism to optimism may provide the fuel needed to bring potentially difficult tasks from conception to fruition.

A third risk is that positive self-perceptions may have social costs. A specific source of evidence of the self-serving pattern in ability assessment examined the use of idiosyncratic definitions of traits and abilities. The authors suggested that the social costs occur when one's definition of ability is perceived to be the only one relevant to achievement outcomes. In other words, wherever people fail to recognise when other plausible definitions of ability are relevant for success, estimates of their future well-being will be overstated.

A fourth risk is that it may be harmful to realize that one's actual competence does not match up to their illusions. This can be harmful to the ego and result in actually performing worse in situations such as college.

Although positive illusions may have short-term benefits, they come with long-term costs. Positive illusions have been linked with decreasing levels of self-esteem and well-being, as well as narcissism and lower academic achievement among students.

== Negative counterparts ==
Although more academic attention has focused on positive illusions, there are systematic negative illusions that are revealed under slightly different circumstances. For example, while college students rate themselves as more likely than average to live to 70, they believe they are less likely than average to live to 100. People regard themselves as above average on easy tasks such as riding a bicycle but below average on difficult tasks like riding a unicycle. In 2007, Moore named the latter effect the "worse-than-average effect". In general, people overestimate their relative standing when their absolute standing is high and underestimate it when their absolute standing is low.

== Mitigation ==
Depressive realism suggests that depressed people actually have a more realistic view of themselves and the world than mentally healthy people. The nature of depression seems to have its role in diminishing positive illusions. For example, individuals who are low in self-esteem, slightly depressed, or both, are more balanced in self-perceptions. Likewise, these mildly depressed individuals are found to be less vulnerable to overestimations of (their) control over events and to assess future circumstances in biased fashion.

However, these findings may not be because depressed people have fewer illusions than people who are not depressed. Studies such as Dykman et al. (1989) show that depressed people believe they have no control in situations where they actually do, so their perspection is not more accurate overall. It might also be that the pessimistic bias of depressives results in "depressive realism" when, for example, measuring estimation of control when there is none, as proposed by Allan et al. (2007). Also, Msetfi et al. (2005) and Msetfi et al. (2007) found that when replicating Alloy and Abramson's findings the overestimation of control in nondepressed people only showed up when the interval was long enough, implying that this is because they take more aspects of a situation into account than their depressed counterparts.

Two hypotheses have been stated in the literature with regard to avoiding the drawbacks of positive illusions: firstly by minimising the illusions in order to take the full advantage of the benefits, and secondly through making important decisions. According to Roy Baumeister, a small amount of positive distortion may be optimal. He hypothesizes that those who fall within this optimal margin of illusion may provide for the best mental health.

== See also ==
- Illusory superiority – Cognitive bias
- Positive psychology – Approach of psychological scientific study
- Psychological resilience – Ability to mentally cope with a crisis
- Reference class forecasting – Method of predicting the future
- Self-deception – Psychology of false perceptions and their impact on human behavior
- Pollyanna principle – Tendency to remember pleasant things better
