= English-language idioms =

Common words or phrases with non-literal meanings

An idiom is a common word or phrase with a figurative, non-literal meaning that is understood culturally and differs from what its composite words' denotations would suggest; i.e. the words together have a meaning that is different from the dictionary definitions of the individual words (although some idioms do retain their literal meanings – see the example "kick the bucket" below). By another definition, an idiom is a speech form or an expression of a given language that is peculiar to itself grammatically or cannot be understood from the individual meanings of its elements. For example, an English speaker would understand the phrase "kick the bucket" to mean "to die" – and also to actually kick a bucket. Furthermore, they would understand when each meaning is being used in context.

To evoke the desired effect in the listener, idioms require a precise replication of the phrase: not even articles can be used interchangeably (e.g. "kick a bucket" only retains the literal meaning of the phrase but not the idiomatic meaning).

Idioms should not be confused with other figures of speech such as metaphors, which evoke an image by use of implicit comparisons (e.g., "the man of steel"); similes, which evoke an image by use of explicit comparisons (e.g., "faster than a speeding bullet"); or hyperbole, which exaggerates an image beyond truthfulness (e.g., "more powerful than a locomotive"). Idioms are also not to be confused with proverbs, which are simple sayings that express a truth based on common sense or practical experience.

== Notable idioms in English ==
Idiom	Definition/Translation	Notes	Ref.
a hard pill to swallow	A situation or information that is unpleasant but must be accepted		
a dime a dozen	(US) Anything that is common, inexpensive, and easy to get or available anywhere		
a hot potato	A controversial issue or situation that is awkward or unpleasant to deal with		
a few sandwiches short of a picnic	Lacking intelligence		
ace in the hole	A hidden or secret strength; an unrevealed advantage		
Achilles' heel	A small but fatal weakness in spite of overall strength		
all ears	Listening intently; fully focused or awaiting an explanation		
all thumbs	Clumsy, awkward		
an arm and a leg	Very expensive or costly; a large amount of money		
apple of discord	Anything causing trouble, discord, or jealousy		
around the clock	When something is done all day and all night without stopping		
at the drop of a hat	Without any hesitation; instantly		
back to the drawing board	Revising something (such as a plan) from the beginning, typically after it has failed	(Note: This expression refers to the fact that plans or blueprints are often drawn on a drawing board. It probably originated during World War II, most likely in the caption of a cartoon by Peter Arno published in The New Yorker.)	
back to the grindstone	To return to a hard and/or tedious task		
ball is in his/her/your court	It is up to him/her/you to make the next decision or step.		
balls to the wall	Full throttle; at maximum speed		
barking up the wrong tree	Looking in the wrong place	(Note: Originally a hunting term.)	
basket case	One made powerless or ineffective, as by nerves, panic, or stress	(Note: Originally a British slang term for a quadruple amputee during World War I.)	
beating a dead horse	To uselessly dwell on a subject far beyond its point of resolution		
beat around the bush	To treat a topic but omit its main points, often intentionally or to delay or avoid talking about something difficult or unpleasant		
bed of roses	A situation or activity that is comfortable or easy		
the bee's knees	Something or someone outstandingly good, excellent, or wonderful	(Note: The origin is unclear; it may simply have emerged in imitation of the numerous other animal-related nonsense phrases popular in the 1920s such as "the cat's pyjamas" or "the monkey's eyebrows", or it may be a deliberate inversion of the earlier attested singular "bee's knee" used to refer to something small or insignificant.)	
best of both worlds	A combination of two seemingly contradictory benefits		
bird brain	A person who is not too smart; a person who acts stupid		
bite off more than one can chew	To take on more responsibility than one can manage		
bite the bullet	To endure a painful or unpleasant situation that is unavoidable		
bite the dust	A euphemism for dying or death		
bought the farm	A euphemism for dying or death, especially in an aviation or military context		
break a leg	A wish of good luck to theatre performers before going on stage, due to the belief amongst those in theatre that being wished "good luck" is a curse		
burn the midnight oil	To work late into the night	(Note: Alludes to burning oil to produce light in the time before electric lighting; originated with the English writer Francis Quarles who wrote: "Wee spend our mid-day sweat, or mid-night oyle; :Wee tyre the night in thought; the day in toyle.")	
bust one's chops	To exert oneself	(Note: At the turn of the century, wearing very long sideburns – called "mutton chops" – was common. A bust in the chops was to get hit in the face.)	
by the seat of one's pants	To achieve through instinct or to do something without advance preparation		
by the skin of one's teeth	Narrowly; barely. Usually used in regard to a narrow escape from a disaster.	(Note: The phrase first appears in English in the Geneva Bible (1560), in Job 19:20, which provides a literal translation of the original Hebrew, "I haue escaped with the skinne of my tethe." The original Hebrew בְּעוֹר שִׁנָּי (b'3or shinai) is a phono-semantic match of the Hebrew word בְּקוֹשִׁי (b'qoshi) which means "barely, hardly, with difficulty." It may never be known if this phrase became an idiom before the biblical book of Job was written, or if the word b'qoshi was mis-heard by a scribe.)	
call a spade a spade	To speak the truth, even to the point of being blunt and rude		
call it a day	To declare the end of a task	(Note: Its 19th-century predecessor is seen in the line "It would have been best for Merlin... to quit and call it half a day", from the novel A Connecticut Yankee in King Arthur's Court (1889) by American writer Mark Twain.)	
champ at the bit or chomp at the bit	To show impatience or frustration when delayed		
cheap as chips	Inexpensive; a good bargain		
chew the cud	To meditate or ponder before answering; to be deep in thought; to ruminate		
chew the fat	To chat idly or generally waste time talking		
chink in one's armor	An area of vulnerability	(Note: The word "chink" here is generally used in the sense of a crack or gap.)	
clam up	To become silent; to stop talking		
clutch one's pearls	To be disproportionately shocked or affronted by something one perceives to be vulgar, in bad taste, or morally wrong		
cold feet	Not going through with an action, particularly one which requires long term commitment, due to fear, uncertainty and doubt		
cold shoulder	To display aloofness and disdain		
couch potato	A lazy person		
cool your jets	Calm down.		
crocodile tears	Fake tears or drama tears; fake crying.		
cut off your nose to spite your face	To pursue revenge in a way that would damage oneself more than the object of one's anger		
cut a rug	To dance		
cut the cheese (US)	To pass gas		
cut the mustard	To perform well; to meet expectations		
dicking around	Messing about, not making any progress		
dig one's heels in	Refuse to change one's plans or ideas, especially when counseled otherwise		
dodge a bullet	Avoid something bad, harmful, or unpleasant		
dollars to donuts	Assert certainty that something is either true or likely to occur, often expressed as a wager of something expensive (dollars) against something cheap (donuts)		
don't count your chickens before they hatch	Don't make plans for something that may not happen; alternatively, don't make an assumption about something that does not have a definitively predetermined outcome.		
don't bite the hand that feeds you	Don't be ungrateful to individuals who aid you		
don't cry over spilled milk	Don't become upset over something that has already happened and you cannot change		
don't have a cow	Don't overreact		
drop a dime (US)	To make a telephone call; to be an informant; (basketball) an assist		
elephant in the room	An obvious, pressing issue left unaddressed due to its sensitive nature		
eleventh hour	At the last minute; the latest possible time before it is too late		
fall off the turnip truck	To be naïve, inexperienced, or unsophisticated. Sometimes used in a rural sense.		
fish out of water	refers to a person who is in unfamiliar, and often uncomfortable surroundings		
fit as a fiddle	In good physical health		
for a song	Almost free; very cheap		
fly in the ointment	A minor drawback or imperfection, especially one that was not at first apparent, that detracts from something positive, spoils something valuable, or is a source of annoyance		
fly on the wall	To join an otherwise private interaction, unnoticed to watch and/or listen to something		
from A to Z	Covering a complete range; comprehensively	(Note: As of the English alphabet, which ranges from the first letter, A, to the last letter, Z.)	
from scratch / make from scratch	To make from original ingredients; to start from the beginning with no prior preparation		
get bent out of shape	To take offense; to get worked up, aggravated, or annoyed		
get a wriggle on	To move quickly or hurry		
get one's ducks in a row	to become well prepared for a desired outcome		
get one's knickers in a twist	(UK) To become overwrought or unnecessarily upset over a trivial matter		
get one's panties in a wad	To become overwrought or unnecessarily upset over a trivial matter		
get wind of (something)	To find out about (something), to hear about (something)		
get your goat	To irritate someone		
gone south	having an unforeseen or chaotic result		
go to the dogs	To go bad, to go in a bad direction		
grasp the nettle	To tackle a problem in a bold manner, despite the difficulty or complexity of doing so; to solve a problem despite short-term adverse consequences.		
have a blast	To have a good time; to enjoy oneself.		
have all your Christmases come at once	To have extreme good fortune.		
have eyes bigger than one's stomach	To have asked for or taken more of something (especially food) than one is actually capable of handling (or eating)		
have eyes in the back of one's head	To be able to perceive things and events that are outside of one's field of vision		
head over heels	Be smitten, infatuated		
heard it through the grapevine	To have learned something through gossip, hearsay, or a rumor		
hit the ceiling/roof	To become enraged, possibly in an overreaction		
hit the nail on the head	1. To describe exactly what is causing a situation or problem; 2. To do or say exactly the right thing or to find the exact answer; 3. To do something in the most effective and efficient way; 4. To be accurate or correct about something.		
hit the road	To leave; start a journey		
hit the sack/sheets/hay	To go to bed; to go to sleep.		
hit the spot	To be particularly pleasing or appropriate; to be just right.		
hold all the cards	To control a situation; to be the one making the decisions.		
hold your horses	Wait. Slow down. Be stable.		
hook, line and sinker	To be completely fooled by a deception		
in for a penny, in for a pound	All in. UK money "penny" short for "pence" and pound. Usually requires explanation for it to make sense to Americans and non-British English speakers.		
in over one's head	Overwhelmed or exasperated, usually by excessive responsibilities		
it is what it is	This challenging circumstance is simply a fact, to be accepted or dealt with.	(Note: Earliest usage unknown. In 1945, Bertrand Russell wrote of a logician's irritation that "the world is what it is"; by 1949 the full phrase appeared in the Nebraska State Journal.)	
it's raining goats and cows	Significantly heavy rain		
jack of all trades	A person who is versatile and capable of many different things		
jump ship	To leave a job, organization, or activity suddenly		
jump the gun	To start something before it is prudent or permitted; to act too hastily.		
jumping the shark	A creative work, an idea or entity reaching a point in which it has exhausted its core intent and is introducing new ideas that are discordant with its original purpose		
Kennywood's open	(Western Pennsylvania) to have your fly open		
kick the bucket	A euphemism for dying or death		
kick the habit	To stop engaging in a habitual practice		
kill two birds with one stone	To accomplish two different tasks at the same time and/or with a single action		
king's ransom	A large sum of money		
let the cat out of the bag	To reveal a secret		
light up like a Christmas tree	To become cheerful or excited.		
like pulling teeth	Having difficulty in getting a person or item to act in a desired fashion; reference to a difficult task.		
like turkeys voting for Christmas	Making a choice against one's self-interest		
look a gift horse in the mouth	To find fault with something that has been received as a gift or favor		
loose cannon	A person who is uncontrollable and unpredictable but likely to cause damage to the group of which they are a member		
method to (one's) madness	Despite one's seemingly random approach, there is actually orderly structure or logic to it.		
mum's the word	To keep silent or quiet.	(Note: Mum is a Middle English word meaning 'silent', and may be derived from the mummer who acts without speaking. During World War II, variants of the idiom appeared on posters through the United Kingdom reminding citizens to avoid speaking about potential war secrets. Catchphrases included "Be like Dad: Keep Mum" and "Keep mum, she's not so dumb".)	
my two cents	(Canada and US) One's opinion on the subject		
nip (something) in the bud	To stop something at an early stage, before it can develop into something of more significance (especially an obstacle or frustration)		
no horse in this race or no dog in this fight	No vested interest in the outcome of a particular conflict, contest or debate		
off one's trolley or off one's rocker	Crazy, demented, out of one's mind, in a confused or befuddled state of mind, senile	(Note: Since both "off one's trolley" and "off one's rocker" became popular in the late 1890s about the same time streetcars were installed in major American cities, and since "rocker", like "trolley", means the wheel or runner that makes contact with an overhead electric cable, it is likely that the "rocker" of the expression carries the same meaning as "trolley". "Off your trolley" may refer to the fact that when the wires are "off the trolley", the vehicle no longer receives an electric current and is, therefore, rendered inoperative.)	
off the hook	To escape a situation of responsibility or obligation, or, less frequently, danger		
the oldest trick in the book	An effective way of tricking someone even though it is a very popular method		
once in a blue moon	Occurring very rarely		
own goal	To do something accidentally negative against yourself or your own team		
part and parcel	The attribute of being an integral or essential component of another object		
pop one's clogs	(UK) A euphemism for dying or death		
the pot calling the kettle black	Used when someone making an accusation is equally as guilty as those being accused		
piece of cake	A job, task or other activity that is pleasant – or, by extension, easy or simple		
not one’s cup of tea	Not the type of thing the person likes.		
preaching to the choir	To present a side of a discussion or argument to someone who already agrees with it; essentially, wasting your time.		
pull oneself together	To recover control of one's emotions.		
pull somebody's leg	To tease or joke by telling a lie		
push the envelope	To approach, extend, or go beyond the limits of what is possible; to pioneer.	(Note: This expression originated as aviation slang and referred to graphs of aerodynamic performance on which "the envelope" is the boundary line representing the limit of an aircraft's capabilities (especially its altitude and speed). It was popularized by Tom Wolfe's 1979 book The Right Stuff.)	
pushing up daisies	A euphemism for dying or death		
put a spoke in one's wheel	To disrupt, foil, or cause problems to one's plan, activity, or project.		
put on airs	An English language idiom and a colloquial phrase meant to describe a person who acts superior, or one who behaves as if they are more important than others.		
put the cat among the pigeons	To create a disturbance and cause trouble		
raining cats and dogs	Raining very hard or strongly		
right as rain	Needed, appropriate, essential, or hoped-for; also has come to mean perfect, well, or absolutely right.	(Note: The life of an agrarian community depends on the success of the local crops, which in turn depends on rain. In pre-industrial times, rain was widely appreciated as essential for survival.)	
rock the boat	To do or say something that will upset people or cause problems		
screw the pooch	To screw up; to fail in dramatic and ignominious fashion.		
see a man about a dog	A euphemistic way to announce one's departure while concealing the true purpose.		
shoot the breeze	To chat idly or casually, without any serious topic of conversation		
shooting fish in a barrel	Frivolously performing a simple task		
sleep with the fishes	To be murdered and thrown into a body of water	(Note: The original text in Mario Puzo's 1969 novel The Godfather reads: "'The fish means that Luca Brasi is sleeping on the bottom of the ocean,' he said. 'It's an old Sicilian message.'")	
speak of the devil (and he shall appear)	Used when an object of discussion unexpectedly becomes present during the conversation		
spill the beans	To reveal someone's secret		
spin one's wheels	To expel much effort for little or no gain		
stay in one's lane	To avoid interfering with, passing judgement on, or giving unsolicited advice about issues beyond one's purview or expertise; to mind one's own business.		
step up to the plate	To deliver beyond expectations		
stick out like a sore thumb	Something that is clearly out of place		
straw that broke the camel's back	The last in a line of unacceptable occurrences; the final tipping point in a sensitive situation.		
strike while the iron is hot	To immediately take advantage of a positive opportunity, before the situation changes.		
take a shine	To develop a liking or fondness for someone or something		
take the biscuit	(UK) To be particularly bad, objectionable, or egregious		
take (or grab) the bull by the horns	To deal bravely and decisively with a difficult, dangerous, or unpleasant situation; to deal with a matter in a direct manner, especially to confront a difficulty rather than avoid it.		
take the cake	(US) To be especially good or outstanding. Alternatively (US) To be particularly bad, objectionable, or egregious.		
take the piss	(UK) To tease, ridicule, or mock someone		
take with a grain of salt	To not take what someone says too seriously; to treat someone's words with a degree of skepticism.		
through thick and thin	through all obstacles in a path; in good times and bad times		
throw stones in glass houses	One who is vulnerable to criticism regarding a certain issue should not criticize others about the same issue.		
throw the baby out with the bathwater	To discard, especially inadvertently, something valuable while in the process of removing or rejecting something unwanted		
throw under the bus	To betray or sacrifice someone for selfish reasons		
snake in the grass	An unrecognizable danger or hidden enemy		
thumb one's nose	To express scorn or disregard		
tie one on	To get drunk		
to and fro or toing and froing	To move from one place to another; going back and forth; here and there.		
to steal someone's thunder	To preempt someone and rob them of gravitas or attention. To take credit for something someone else did.		
toot your own horn	bragging about something		
trip the light fantastic	To dance	(Note: The expression is generally attributed to John Milton's 1645 poem L'Allegro, which includes the lines: "Com, and trip it as ye go, On the light fantastick toe.")	
two a penny	Cheap or common		
under one's thumb	Under one's control		
under the weather	Feeling sick or poorly		
the whole nine yards	Everything; all the way		
watching paint dry	To describe something tedious or boring		
water under the bridge	Something that already happened in the past and should not be the primary focus of attention because it cannot be changed		
wild goose chase	A frustrating or lengthy undertaking that accomplishes little		
willy-nilly	An activity, situation, decision or event that happens in a disorganized manner; or it is done haphazardly, chaotically and randomly, without any sort of planning or direction.	(Note: The idiom has another meaning; "with or against one's will", which was popularized from the expression "will he, nill he", found in Shakespeare's Hamlet.)	
wolf down	To devour (food) greedily.		
you can say that again	That is very true; an expression of wholehearted agreement.		

== See also ==
- List of 19th-century English-language idioms
- List of proverbial phrases
- List of business terms
- List of racist idioms
- Siamese twins (linguistics)
- wikt:Category:English idioms
- Cliché
