= Self-serving bias =

Distortion to enhance self-esteem, or to see oneself overly favorably

A self-serving bias is any cognitive or perceptual process that is distorted by the need to maintain and enhance self-esteem, or the tendency to perceive oneself in an overly favorable manner. It is the belief that individuals tend to ascribe success to their own abilities and efforts, but ascribe failure to external factors. When individuals reject the validity of negative feedback, focus on their strengths and achievements but overlook their faults and failures, or take more credit for their group's work than they give to other members, they are protecting their self-esteem from threat and injury. These cognitive and perceptual tendencies perpetuate illusions and error, but they also serve the self's need for esteem. For example, a student who attributes earning a good grade on an exam to their own intelligence and preparation but attributes earning a poor grade to the teacher's poor teaching ability or unfair test questions might be exhibiting a self-serving bias. Studies have shown that similar attributions are made in various situations, such as the workplace, interpersonal relationships, sports, and consumer decisions.

Both motivational processes (i.e. self-enhancement, self-presentation) and cognitive processes (i.e. locus of control, self-esteem) influence the self-serving bias. There are both cross-cultural (i.e. individualistic and collectivistic culture differences) and special clinical population (i.e. depression) considerations within the bias. Much of the research on the self-serving bias has used participant self-reports of attribution based on experimental manipulation of task outcomes or in naturalistic situations. Some more modern research, however, has shifted focus to physiological manipulations, such as emotional inducement and neural activation, in an attempt to better understand the biological mechanisms that contribute to the self-serving bias.

== History ==
The theory of self-serving biases first came to attention in the late 1960s to early 1970s. As research on this topic grew, some people had concerns about it. In 1971, a fear emerged that the hypothesis would prove to be incorrect, much like the perceptual defense hypothesis by Dixon. However, the theory now holds strong. When this theory was still being developed it was during the research of attribution bias. Fritz Heider found that in ambiguous situations people made attributions based on their own needs, in order to maintain a higher self-esteem and viewpoint. This specific tendency became what we now know as the self-serving bias. Miller and Ross conducted a study in 1975 that was one of the earliest to assess not only self-serving bias but also the attributions for successes and failures within this theory. They argued that the self-serving bias people create is rational and not dependent on one's need for self-esteem. This means that if the outcome of an event is consistent with the person's expectation, then they will attribute dispositional (internal) factors. On the other hand, if the outcome of the event does not match the person's expectations, they will make situational attributions by blaming their surroundings instead of themselves.

== Methods ==
=== Laboratory testing ===
Investigations of the self-serving bias in the laboratory differ depending on the experimental goals, but have basic fundamental aspects. Participants perform some task, often of intelligence, social sensitivity, teaching ability, or therapy skills. Participants may be asked to work alone, in pairs, or in groups. After task completion, participants are given randomized bogus feedback. Some studies employ emotion-induction mechanisms to investigate moderating effects on the self-serving bias. Finally, participants make attributions for the given outcomes. These attributions are assessed by the researchers to determine implications for the self-serving bias.

=== Neural experimentation ===
Some more modern testing employs neural imaging techniques to supplement the fundamental self-serving bias laboratory procedures. Neural correlates of the self-serving bias have been investigated by electroencephalography (EEG), as well as functional magnetic resonance imaging (fMRI). These procedures allow for insight into brain area activity during exhibition of a self-serving bias, as well as a mechanism to differentiate brain activity between healthy and clinical populations.

=== Naturalistic investigation ===
Retrospective performance outcomes can be used in investigation of the self-serving bias. An example of this is reported company performance followed up by self-report of outcome attributions. These self-report attributions can then be used to assess how successes and failures are viewed by company employees and executives. This method can be used for numerous outcome variables to determine the presence or absence of the self-serving bias.

== Factors and variables ==
=== Motivation ===
Two types of motivation affect the self-serving bias: self-enhancement and self-presentation. Self-enhancement aims to uphold self-worth; attributing successes internally and failures externally helps people in their self-enhancement. Self-presentation refers to the drive to convey a desired image to others and make self-serving attributions to manage impressions. For example, they claim personal responsibility for successes but not failures in an attempt to influence how others perceive them. Motivation works in conjunction with cognitive factors to produce personally satisfying and self-preserving attributions for outcomes.

=== Locus of control ===
Locus of control is one of the main influences of attribution style. Individuals with an internal locus of control believe that they have personal control over situations and that their actions matter. Those with an external locus of control believe that outside forces, chance, and luck determine situations and that their actions can not change anything. Individuals with an external locus of control are more likely to exhibit a self-serving bias following failure than those with an internal locus of control. The difference in attribution style between individuals with internal and external loci of control, however, is not as marked in successful outcomes, as individuals with both types attribution style have less need to defend their self-images in success. Airplane pilots with an internal locus of control were likely to exhibit a self-serving bias in regard to their skill and levels of safety.

=== Gender ===
Studies have shown a slight discrepancy in males' and females' use of the self-serving bias. In self-report surveys investigating partner interactions of romantic couples, men tended to attribute negative interactions to their partners more than women did. This is evidence that men may exhibit the self-serving bias more than women, although the study did not look at positive interaction attributions.

=== Age ===
Older adults have been shown to make more internal causal attributions for negative outcomes. Differential attribution style at different ages indicates that the self-serving bias may be less likely in older adults. These older adults who attributed negative outcomes to more internal factors also rated themselves to be in poorer health, so negative emotional factors may confound the found age effects.

=== Culture ===
There is evidence of cross-cultural differences in the tendency to exhibit the self-serving bias, particularly when considering individualistic (Western) versus collectivistic (non-Western) societies. Family and group goals are important in collectivistic cultures. In contrast, the individual goals and identity focused on in individualistic societies increases the need for people within those cultures to guard and boost their personal self-esteem. While differences have been shown, conflicting literature has cited similarity in causal attributions across both individual and collective cultures, specifically between Belgium, West Germany, South Korea, and England. Naturalistic observation and information comparing United States and Japanese companies outcome attributions shows that the meaning and psychological function of internal versus external attributions are similar across cultures but that the difference is in the strategy of attribution. No consensus has been reached on cross-culture influences on the self-serving bias, though some systematic differences do seem to be present, especially between Western and non-Western cultures. For example, a study conducted by Kudo and Numuzaki showed that the participants in the success condition provided more internal attributions than the participants in the failure condition even though past research has constantly shown that Japanese people do not tend to show a self-serving bias. Another study conducted by Hugten and Witteloostuijn displayed the results that student participants between the ages of 13 and 15 who mainly process feedback in a non-native English tend to show more self-serving bias than those who process feedback in their native Dutch language.

=== Role ===
Investigations of self-serving bias distinguish between the role of participants as the actor of a task or as the observer of someone else performing a task, relating closely to actor–observer asymmetry. Actors of a task exhibit the self-serving bias in their attributions to their own success or failure feedback, whereas observers do not make the same attributions about another person's task outcome. Observers tend to be more objective in their tendency to ascribe internal or external attributions to other people's outcomes. This may be due to the fact that the self-image of actors is challenged directly and therefore actors feel the need to protect their own self-image, but do not feel the same inclination to do so when the self-image of others is threatened.

=== Self-esteem and emotion ===
Emotions can influence feelings of self-esteem, which in turn alters the need to protect one's self-identity. Individuals with higher self-esteem are thought to have more to protect in their self-image, and therefore exhibit the self-serving bias more often than those individuals with lower self-esteem. In a study, participants who were induced to feel the emotions of guilt or revulsion were less likely to make self-serving attributions for success and less likely to make self-protecting attributions for failure. Coleman concluded that the two emotions of guilt and revulsion lead to a drop in self-esteem, and thus a reduction in the use of the self-serving bias.

=== Self-awareness and probability of improvement ===
The relationship between individuals' awareness levels and perceived probability of improvement also influences the activation of the self-serving bias. Individuals with high self-awareness attribute failure internally when they perceive a high probability of improvement. However, they will engage in self-serving bias, attributing failure externally when they perceive a low probability of improvement. Individuals low in self-awareness will attribute failure externally regardless of their perceived probability of improvement.

== Real-world implications ==
=== Interpersonal relations ===
Whether the self-serving bias is exhibited may depend on interpersonal closeness, relationships in a social context. When working in pairs to complete interdependent outcome tasks, relationally close pairs did not show a self-serving bias while relationally distant pairs did. A study on self-serving bias in relational context suggests this is due to the idea that close relationships place limits on an individual's self enhancement tendencies. The individual becomes more modest, when in a close relationship, and is less likely to use that relationship for his or her own benefit. Understanding why partners refrain from the self-serving bias is still in question but can partially be explained by favorable impression those in close relationships have for one another. A similar result was shown when looking at pairs of friends and strangers. Pairs performed an interdependent outcomes creativity test and were then given a bogus pipeline for a success or failure outcome. Strangers exhibited the self-serving bias in responsibility attributions, but friends tended to make joint attributions for both success and failure. Researchers have taken this as evidence for "boundaries on self-enhancement". In another study conducted in 2016, the implicit and explicit evaluation of 108 partners and exes as parents who were either married, separated or divorced was researched to investigate if the self-serving bias influenced them. Using two Implicit Association tests, one measuring Self vs Partner and the other measuring Self vs Ex, results showed that most of the time, men and women consider their exes or partners as less suitable parents which demonstrates the self-serving bias as they "ascribe more easily successes to internal factors" and failures towards their partners. Also, another result demonstrated that "women revealed a higher self-serving bias than men on both implicit and explicit measures, but only toward exes and not toward current partners" because they consider their exes as an out-group and their partners as an in-group.

=== Workplace ===
The self-serving bias can be found in several aspects of the workplace. Research shows that the self-serving bias is used to explain employment: being hired for a job is attributed to personal factors, whereas failure to obtain a job is attributed to external factors. Experimental investigation of the explanations for unemployment through asking participants to imagine particular job opportunities and likelihood of getting those jobs, however, did not show such a self-serving bias. Researchers claim that this may be due to the actor-observer role differences in the self-serving bias. Within the workplace, victims of serious occupational accidents tend to attribute their accidents to external factors, whereas their coworkers and management tend to attribute the accidents to the victims' own actions. Interpersonal dynamics of the self-serving bias in the previous section have implications for attributions for outcomes in the workplace. In an investigation of group dynamics, virtual group members had to complete a decision-making task via computer-mediated communication. Results showed that the self-serving bias was present in negative outcomes, and that greater interpersonal distance from group members increased blame for negative outcomes.

==== Narcissism ====
Studies revealed that narcissism was related to enhanced self-ratings of leadership, even when controlling for the Big Five traits. Another study showed that narcissism was related to enhanced leadership self-perceptions; indeed, whereas narcissism was significantly positively correlated with self-ratings of leadership, it was significantly negatively related to other ratings of leadership. This study also revealed that narcissism was related to more favorable self-ratings of workplace deviance and contextual performance compared to other (supervisor) ratings. Because narcissism broadly reflects strong self-admiration and behavioral tendencies which may not be viewed positively by others it is possible that narcissism influences self- and other perceptions differently, and insight into this possibility may be important given that differences in perceptions are the foundation for certain types of performance management and development practices.

=== Classroom ===
Studies in both lab and field settings have shown both teachers and students hold self-serving biases in regard to outcomes in the classroom. These attributions hold the potential for conflict between teacher and student since neither will take personal responsibility, as the student may blame the teacher while the teacher holds the student accountable. However, both teachers and students also reported being aware of the others' bias, which indicated there may be a feasible conflict resolution mechanism.

=== Computer technology ===
Computers have become an integral part of everyday life, and research has shown that individuals may subconsciously treat interactions with computers as they would treat a social situation. This finding combined with what is known about the self-serving bias in interpersonal relations indicates that consumers that use a computer to buy products will take personal credit for successful purchases but blame the computer for negative purchase experiences. It was also found, however, that consumers are more willing to attribute successful purchases to the computer and not ascribe blame to the computer for failed purchases if they have "intimate self-disclosure" with the computer, which Moon describes as revelation of personal information that makes the discloser feel vulnerable. Another reason is that people are so used to bad functionality, counterintuitive features, bugs, and sudden crashes of most contemporary software applications that they tend not to complain about computer problems. Instead, they believe it is their personal responsibility to predict possible issues and to find solutions to computer problems. This unique phenomenon has been recently observed in several human-computer interaction investigations.

=== Sports ===
Individuals have been shown to exhibit the self-serving bias in regard to sports outcomes. In one study, collegiate wrestlers at the Division I level made self-reported attributions of the outcomes in their preseason matches. Winners were more likely than losers to attribute the match outcome to internal causes. The researchers note that wrestling is a one-on-one sport and has clearly defined winners. Therefore, other sports of this nature may show similar results, but other team sports or sports with more ambiguous outcomes may not show the same pattern for the self-serving bias. In another study conducted in 1987, the research focused on comparing the self-serving attributions made by individuals who played single sports and those who played in teams. The study gathered 549 statements that were coded for attributional content from lone performers such as tennis and golf players and team performers such as baseball, football or basketball players. The results showed that "lone performers made more self-serving attributions than team performers" because their performance outcomes have a greater effect on their individual esteem unlike for group outcomes where it "must often be distributed among all participants." To expand upon self-serving attributions made by team sports, a study conducted in 1980 coded "newspaper accounts of baseball and football for attributional content." The coding of the newspaper accounts showed that there was a "tendency to make internal attributions for success and external attributions for failure" which supports the self-serving bias as about 75% of the attributions from winning teams were internal while about 55% of attributions from losing teams were internal.

=== Depression ===
Clinically depressed patients tend to show less of a self-serving bias than individuals in the general population. In a study exploring the effects of mood on the self-serving bias, the moods of participants were manipulated to be either positive or negative. Negative mood participants were less likely to attribute successful outcomes to the self than positive mood participants, attributing success to external factors. It has been suggested that the negative mood in depressed individuals as well as their self-focused attention explains why clinically depressed populations are less likely to exhibit the self-serving bias than normal populations.

=== Impacts in negotiation ===
Self-Serving bias is defined also by Kaplan et al. to individual's preferences, which effects to his/her beliefs in an optimistic way. Kaplan et al. also defines, that SSB should be termed as 'self-defeating' phenomenon as it appears for persons, who does not give up. Furthermore, Kaplan et al. state, that specific type of self-serving bias is wishful thinking. This is typically present, when an unpleasant surprise pops up in the negotiation, particularly when the opponent has made preparations carefully. Another example is well-known phenomenon from law-court and is commonly used also in law-based TV-series. We can say, that according to Kaplan et al.'s finding, that self-serving bias is playing a major role in negotiation context. There is an emotional effect to the negotiations and there seems to be a reflection between self-serving bias and emotions.

== Neural research outcomes ==
=== Functional magnetic resonance imaging (fMRI) ===
The self-serving bias has been investigated by the fMRI method in normal populations. Attributions using the bias show activation in the dorsal striatum, which plays a role in motivated behavior, as well as in the dorsal anterior cingulate. In clinically depressed patients, there appear to be weaker connections between the dorsomedial prefrontal cortex and limbic areas of the brain, so this connection may play a role in self-serving attributions.

=== Electroencephalography (EEG) ===
In a study employing the EEG method of examining brain activation, participants were given bogus outcome feedback that indicated either success or failure and told to make attributions. Different from non-self-serving responses, self-serving responses did not show increased dorsomedial frontal cortex activity preceding attribution decisions. Such lack of brain activity implies that self-control, which is controlled by the dorsomedial frontal cortex, is not as prominent in self-serving attributions as non-self-serving ones.

== See also ==
- Attribution (psychology)
- Chauvinism
- Choice-supportive bias
- Cognitive bias
- Confidence
- Dunning–Kruger effect
- Fundamental attribution error
- Grandiose delusions
- Haughtiness
- Hubris
- Icarus complex
- Illusory superiority
- List of cognitive biases
- Marking your own homework
- Moral hazard
- Narcissism
- Omission bias
- Optimism bias
- Overconfidence effect
- Positive illusions
- Self-licensing
- Social projection
- Vanity
