= Hold Your Horses =

Hold Your Horses may refer to:

- Hold your horses, a common idiom to mean "hold on" or wait
- Hold Your Horses (film), a 1921 American silent film directed by E. Mason Hopper
- Hold Your Horses (First Choice album), 1979
- Hold Your Horses (Ella Edmondson album), 2009
- "Hold Your Horses", a 2024 song by Tebey

== See also ==
- Hold Your Horse Is, a 2002 album by Hella
