= Illusion of control =

False belief in an ability to control events

The illusion of control is the tendency for people to overestimate their ability to control events. It was named by American psychologist Ellen Langer and is thought to influence gambling behavior and belief in the paranormal. Along with illusory superiority and optimism bias, the illusion of control is one of the positive illusions.

== Definition ==
The illusion of control is the tendency for people to overestimate their ability to control events, for example, when someone feels a sense of control over outcomes that they demonstrably do not influence.

The illusion might arise because a person lacks direct introspective insight into whether they are in control of events. This has been called the introspection illusion. Instead, they may judge their degree of control by a process which is often unreliable. As a result, they see themselves as responsible for events to which there is little or no causal link. For example, in one study, college students were in a virtual reality setting to treat a fear of heights using an elevator. Those who were told that they had control, yet had none, felt as though they had as much control as those who actually did have control over the elevator. Those who were led to believe they did not have control said they felt as though they had little control.

== History ==
Psychological theorists have consistently emphasized the importance of perceptions of control over life events. One of the earliest instances was when Alfred Adler argued that people strive for proficiency in their lives. Heider later proposed that humans have a strong motive to control their environment and Wyatt Mann hypothesized a basic competence motive that people satisfy by exerting control. Bernard Weiner, an attribution theorist, modified his original theory of achievement motivation to include a controllability dimension. Harold Kelley then argued that people's failure to detect noncontingencies may result in their attributing uncontrollable outcomes to personal causes. Nearer to the present, Taylor and Brown argued that positive illusions, including the illusion of control, foster mental health.

The effect was named by American psychologist Ellen Langer and has been replicated in many different contexts.

== Occurrence ==
The illusion is more common in familiar situations, and in situations where the person knows the desired outcome. Feedback that emphasizes success rather than failure can increase the effect, while feedback that emphasizes failure can decrease or reverse the effect. The illusion is weaker for depressed individuals and is stronger when individuals have an emotional need to control the outcome. The illusion is strengthened by stressful and competitive situations, including financial trading. Although people are likely to overestimate their control when the situations are heavily chance-determined, they also tend to underestimate their control when they actually have it, which runs contrary to some theories of the illusion and its adaptiveness. People also showed a higher illusion of control when they were allowed to become familiar with a task through practice trials, make their choice before the event happens like with throwing dice, and when they can make their choice rather than have it made for them with the same odds. People are more likely to show control when they have more answers right at the beginning than at the end, even when the people had the same number of correct answers.

Being in a position of power enhances the illusion of control, which may lead to overreach in risk taking.

== By proxy ==
At times, people attempt to gain control by transferring responsibility to more capable or "luckier" others to act for them. By forfeiting direct control, it is perceived to be a valid way of maximizing outcomes. This illusion of control by proxy is a significant theoretical extension of the traditional illusion of control model. People will of course give up control if another person is thought to have more knowledge or skill in areas such as medicine where actual skill and knowledge are involved. In cases like these it is entirely rational to give up responsibility to people such as doctors. However, when it comes to events of pure chance, allowing another to make decisions (or gamble) on one's behalf, because they are seen as luckier is not rational and would go against people's well-documented desire for control in uncontrollable situations. However, it does seem plausible since people generally believe that they can possess luck and employ it to advantage in games of chance, and it is not a far leap that others may also be seen as lucky and able to control uncontrollable events. In a study conducted in Singapore, the perception of control, luck, and skill when gambling led to an increase in gambling behavior.

In one instance, a lottery pool at a company decides who picks the numbers and buys the tickets based on the wins and losses of each member. The member with the best record becomes the representative until they accumulate a certain number of losses and then a new representative is picked based on wins and losses. Even though no member is truly better than the other and it is all by chance, they still would rather have someone with seemingly more luck to have control over them.

In another real-world example, in the 2002 Olympics men's and women's hockey finals, Team Canada beat Team USA. Prior to the match, a Canadian coin was secretly placed under the ice before the game, an action which the players and officials believed would bring them luck. The members of Team Canada were the only people who knew the coin had been placed there. The coin was later put in the Hockey Hall of Fame where there was an opening so people could touch it. People believed they could transfer luck from the coin to themselves by touching it, and thereby change their own luck.

== Demonstration ==
The illusion of control is demonstrated by three converging lines of evidence: 1) laboratory experiments, 2) observed behavior in familiar games of chance such as lotteries, and 3) self-reports of real-world behavior.

=== Laboratory experiments ===
One kind of laboratory demonstration involves two lights marked "Score" and "No Score". Subjects have to try to control which one lights up. In one version of this experiment, subjects could press either of two buttons. Another version had one button, which subjects decided on each trial to press or not. Subjects had a variable degree of control over the lights, or none at all, depending on how the buttons were connected. The experimenters made clear that there might be no relation between the subjects' actions and the lights. Subjects estimated how much control they had over the lights. These estimates bore no relation to how much control they actually had, but was related to how often the "Score" light lit up. Even when their choices made no difference at all, subjects confidently reported exerting some control over the lights.

=== Observed behavior in games ===
Ellen Langer's research demonstrated that people were more likely to behave as if they could exercise control in a chance situation where "skill cues" were present. By skill cues, Langer meant properties of the situation more normally associated with the exercise of skill, in particular the exercise of choice, competition, familiarity with the stimulus and involvement in decisions. One simple form of this effect is found in casinos: when rolling dice in a craps game people tend to throw harder when they need high numbers and softer for low numbers.

In another experiment, subjects had to predict the outcome of thirty coin tosses. The feedback was rigged so that each subject was right exactly half the time, but the groups differed in where their "hits" occurred. Some were told that their early guesses were accurate. Others were told that their successes were distributed evenly through the thirty trials. Afterwards, they were surveyed about their performance. Subjects with early "hits" overestimated their total successes and had higher expectations of how they would perform on future guessing games. This result resembles the irrational primacy effect in which people give greater weight to information that occurs earlier in a series. Forty percent of the subjects believed their performance on this chance task would improve with practice, and twenty-five percent said that distraction would impair their performance.

Another of Langer's experiments replicated by other researchers involves a lottery. Subjects are either given tickets at random or allowed to choose their own. They can then trade their tickets for others with a higher chance of paying out. Subjects who had chosen their own ticket were more reluctant to part with it. Tickets bearing familiar symbols were less likely to be exchanged than others with unfamiliar symbols. Although these lotteries were random, subjects behaved as though their choice of ticket affected the outcome. Participants who chose their own numbers were less likely to trade their ticket even for one in a game with better odds.

=== Self-reported behavior ===
Yet another way to investigate perceptions of control is to ask people about hypothetical situations, for example their likelihood of being involved in a motor vehicle accident. On average, drivers regard accidents as much less likely in "high-control" situations, such as when they are driving, than in "low-control" situations, such as when they are in the passenger seat. They also rate a high-control accident, such as driving into the car in front, as much less likely than a low-control accident such as being hit from behind by another driver.

== Explanations ==
Ellen Langer, who first demonstrated the illusion of control, explained her findings in terms of a confusion between skill and chance situations. She proposed that people base their judgments of control on "skill cues". These are features of a situation that are usually associated with games of skill, such as competitiveness, familiarity and individual choice. When more of these skill cues are present, the illusion is stronger.

In 1998, Suzanne Thompson and colleagues argued that Langer's explanation was inadequate to explain all the variations in the effect. As an alternative, they proposed that judgments about control are based on a procedure that they called the "control heuristic". This theory proposes that judgments of control depend on two conditions; an intention to create the outcome, and a relationship between the action and outcome. In games of chance, these two conditions frequently go together. As well as an intention to win, there is an action, such as throwing a die or pulling a lever on a slot machine, which is immediately followed by an outcome. Even though the outcome is selected randomly, the control heuristic would result in the player feeling a degree of control over the outcome.

Self-regulation theory offers another explanation. To the extent that people are driven by internal goals concerned with the exercise of control over their environment, they will seek to reassert control in conditions of chaos, uncertainty or stress. One way of coping with a lack of real control is to falsely attribute oneself control of the situation.

The core self-evaluations (CSE) trait is a stable personality trait composed of locus of control, neuroticism, self-efficacy, and self-esteem. While those with high core self-evaluations are likely to believe that they control their own environment (i.e., internal locus of control), very high levels of CSE may lead to the illusion of control.

== Benefits and costs to the individual ==
In 1988 Taylor and Brown have argued that positive illusions, including the illusion of control, are adaptive as they motivate people to persist at tasks when they might otherwise give up. This position is supported by Albert Bandura's claim in 1989 that "optimistic self-appraisals of capability, that are not unduly disparate from what is possible, can be advantageous, whereas veridical judgements can be self-limiting". His argument is essentially concerned with the adaptive effect of optimistic beliefs about control and performance in circumstances where control is possible, rather than perceived control in circumstances where outcomes do not depend on an individual's behavior.

In 1997 Bandura also suggested that:

"In activities where the margins of error are narrow and missteps can produce costly or injurious consequences, personal well-being is best served by highly accurate efficacy appraisal."

Taylor and Brown argue that positive illusions are adaptive, since there is evidence that they are more common in normally mentally healthy individuals than in depressed individuals. However, in 1998 Pacini, Muir and Epstein showed that this may be because depressed people overcompensate for a tendency toward maladaptive intuitive processing by exercising excessive rational control in trivial situations, and note that the difference with non-depressed people disappears in more consequential circumstances.

There is also empirical evidence that high self-efficacy can be maladaptive in some circumstances. In a scenario-based study, Whyte et al. showed in 1997 that participants in whom they had induced high self-efficacy were significantly more likely to escalate commitment to a failing course of action. In 1998 Knee and Zuckerman challenged the definition of mental health used by Taylor and Brown and argue that lack of illusions is associated with a non-defensive personality oriented towards growth and learning and with low ego involvement in outcomes. They present evidence that self-determined individuals are less prone to these illusions.

In the late 1970s, Abramson and Alloy demonstrated that depressed individuals held a more accurate view than their non-depressed counterparts in a test which measured illusion of control. This finding held true even when the depression was manipulated experimentally. However, when replicating the findings Msetfi et al. (2005, 2007) found that the overestimation of control in nondepressed people only showed up when the interval was long enough, implying that this is because they take more aspects of a situation into account than their depressed counterparts. Also, Dykman et al. (1989) showed that depressed people believe they have no control in situations where they actually do, so their perception is not more accurate overall. Allan et al. (2007) has proposed that the pessimistic bias of depressives resulted in "depressive realism" when asked about estimation of control, because depressed individuals are more likely to say no even if they have control.

A number of studies have found a link between a sense of control and health, especially in older people. This link for older people having improved health because of a sense of control was discussed in a study conducted in a nursing home. As the residents at the nursing home were encouraged to make more choices for themselves, there was more sense of control over their daily lives. This increase in control increased their overall happiness and health compared to those not making as many decisions for themselves. It was even speculated that with results so promising could slow down or reverse cognitive decline that may occur with aging.

Fenton-O'Creevy et al. argue, as do Gollwittzer and Kinney in 1998, that while illusory beliefs about control may promote goal striving, they are not conducive to sound decision-making. Illusions of control may cause insensitivity to feedback, impede learning and predispose toward greater objective risk taking (since subjective risk will be reduced by illusion of control).

== Applications ==
Psychologist Daniel Wegner argues that an illusion of control over external events underlies belief in psychokinesis, a supposed paranormal ability to move objects directly using the mind. As evidence, Wegner cites a series of experiments on magical thinking in which subjects were induced to think they had influenced external events. In one experiment, subjects watched a basketball player taking a series of free throws. When they were instructed to visualise him making his shots, they felt that they had contributed to his success.

A study published in 2003 examined traders working in the City of London's investment banks. They each watched a graph being plotted on a computer screen, similar to a real-time graph of a stock price or index. Using three computer keys, they had to raise the value as high as possible. They were warned that the value showed random variations, but that the keys might have some effect. In fact, the fluctuations were not affected by the keys. The traders' ratings of their success measured their susceptibility to the illusion of control. This score was then compared with each trader's performance. Those who were more prone to the illusion scored significantly lower on analysis, risk management and contribution to profits. They also earned significantly less.

== See also ==
- Learned helplessness
- Overconfidence effect
- Self-efficacy
