= Emotional hedge =

Psychological and financial strategy

An emotional hedge is a psychological and financial strategy used to mitigate potential negative emotions by offsetting a personally significant outcome with a compensatory action. The concept is most commonly applied in sports betting, where an individual places a wager against their favored team. If the team wins, the emotional satisfaction compensates for the financial loss; if the team loses, the financial gain cushions the emotional disappointment.

== Reluctance ==
Despite the fact that an emotional hedge guarantees the bettor one positive outcome, it is rarely observed. Optimism bias, in which the probability of a positive outcome is overestimated by an emotionally-driven bettor, plays a part in many people's decision not to make the bet. In sports betting, many are also reluctant to make the bet because they feel that it is disloyal to their favored team.

== See also ==
- Hedge (finance)
- Sports betting
