= Willy nilly =

Willy nilly or willy-nilly may refer to:

- Willy-nilly (idiom), an idiom and a slang that means "haphazardly" or "spontaneously"
- Willy Nilly, a New Zealand television series
- "Willy Nilly", 1965 single by Rufus Thomas
