= Put on airs =

English-language idiom referring to someone who acts superior

A petit maître (little master) – a fashionable French dandy or fop of 1778

To put on airs, also give airs, put in airs, give yourself airs, is an English language idiom and a colloquial phrase meant to describe a person who acts superior, or one who behaves as if they are more important than others.

== Origin ==
It is derived from the French word "air", meaning appearance, and was first used in the 1500s. Variations of the phrase were used throughout the 1700s. The phrase appears in the 1911 Dictionary of French and English by John Bellows. It appears under the entry for the French word poseur meaning to pose, and more specifically "poseur: a person who pretends to be what he or she is not: an affected or insincere person".

== History ==
The phrase is derived from the French word "air" which means appearance or look. The phrase has been in use since the 1500s. To "Give Airs" was also referred to as a fake way of acting. "Put on" is in modern emphatic use means: "to assume deceptively or falsely; to feign, affect or pretend."

The phrase appears in the records of the 1661 Witchcraft trial of Florence Newton. It was said that a woman named Mary Longdon, "...believed her position gave her the right to airs and graces".

It is considered an English Language idiom. The phrase was used in a published book from the 1700s, Put in Airs. The term was used in a book from 1759 by George Farquhar The Constant Couple "...when she puts on her airs, as you call it." The phrase also appears in 1776 in a book by Francis Beaumont called Humorous Lieutenant: "You can give yourself Airs sometimes..."

Amidst the United States Civil War, in 1864, a minstrel song with a chorus and eight verses was published. It includes these lyrics: "Oh! white folks listen, will you now, this darkey's going to sing -.," and includes two verses about personal vanity, followed by five on various Union Army's victories over the Confederacy, concluding: "Now where's this boasted chivalry, who sport the Stars and Bars? / Why they're learning from our Yankee boys the way to put on airs."

It has been variously defined as for example, an 1869 textbook says: "Put on a counterfeit appearance" An 1882 dictionary says: "To put on airs, to assume airs of importance." Another more modern usage: "put on airs and graces to behave affectedly." Typified by false claims of mastery, superiority or pretense.

Putting on airs is an example of divergence behavior, that can be, acting in a contrary way to dissociate oneself from their peers. It is similar to acting boorishly at a wedding reception.

== See also ==
- Colloquialism
- Dandy
- Delusions of grandeur
- Dude
- Flâneur
- Fop
- Gentleman
- God complex
- Highbrow
- Idiom
- Illusory superiority
- List of English-language idioms
- Messiah complex
- Pidgin
- Sophisticated
