= Get a wiggle on =

English language idiom

"Get a wiggle on" is an idiom and colloquial expression in the English language, originating in the 19th century. It means to hurry up; get a move on.

- Get a wiggle on, or we'll miss the beginning of the concert.
- If you don't get a wiggle on, we'll miss the first act.

== Etymology ==
In 1891 Wilson's Photographic Magazine published "The American Psalm of Life" which began, "Get a wiggle on, my lad, Don't walk at a funeral pace..." By 1919 the phrase was also used in a song, "Get a wiggle on, get a wiggle on, Don't stand there with a giggle-on." By the 1920s the term had found its way into the American language as slang.

== History ==
The Cambridge Dictionary defines the phrase as meaning to hurry up. Get a wiggle on is both an English language idiom and a Colloquial Expression. The phrase has been in use since 1891 and is still being used in the 21st century. The similar phrase "get a wriggle on" is slang in Australia and appears in the Aussie Slang Dictionary

== See also ==
- List of English-language idioms
