= Icarus complex =

Psychological complex

The Icarus complex is a term in psychoanalysis and personality theory first used by Henry A. Murray to describe a particular type of overambitious character. Psychosynthesis has applied it to those in whom spiritual ambition exceeds their personality limits, leading to a backlash.

== Etymology ==
Icarus was a Greek mythological figure who tried to escape imprisonment in Crete with his father Daedalus, using wings Daedalus crafted out of feathers and wax. Daedalus warned Icarus not to fly too close to the sun or too low to the sea. Overwhelmed with the excitement of flying, Icarus flew much too high, and as a result the wax melted and his feathers fell off. Down Icarus plunged into the sea, and indeed into death as well. The story of Icarus is often used to signify the dangers of over-ambition.

== Characteristics ==
It is seen in a personality type that contains many or all of the following attributes:

- cynosural narcissism (attention seeking or admiration seeking narcissistic behaviors)
- ascensionism (the notion that the future is not dictated by the past or present, and no destination or goal is unreachable) combined with an anticipation of falling (a foreboding sense of a future "crash and burn")
- Cathexis of fire (an emotional drawing towards, or fascination with, fire)
- possible enuresis (bedwetting) or incontinence in childhood, linked to an abundance of water imagery.

Ancillary consequences of this personality complex are:

- a craving for immortality (reascension)
- a conception of woman as an object to be used for narcissistic gains (sex as narcissistic supply)
- Oedipal defiance.
- Perpetual adolescence.

== Criticism ==
Doubt has been expressed as to the therapeutic value of the diagnosis of Icarus complex.

== See also ==
- Complex (psychology)
- Confidence
- Dunning–Kruger effect
- Grandiose delusions
- Haughtiness
- Hubris
- Narcissism
- Overconfidence effect
- Self-serving bias
- Vanity
- Napoleon complex
