= Delusions of grandeur =

Subtype of delusion

- Other names: Grandiose delusions, expansive delusions
- A cartoon illustrating the phenomenon. People with grandiose delusions wrongly hold themselves at an extraordinarily high status in their mind.
- Specialty: Psychiatry

Delusions of grandeur, also known as grandiose delusions (GDs) or expansive delusions, are a subtype of delusion characterized by the exaggerated belief that one is famous, omnipotent, wealthy, or otherwise very powerful or of a high status. Grandiose delusions often carry a religious, science fictional, or supernatural quality. Examples include the extraordinary belief that one is a deity or celebrity, or that one possesses fantastical talents, accomplishments, or superpowers.

While non-delusional grandiose beliefs are somewhat common—occurring in at least 10% of the general population—and can influence a person's self-esteem, in some cases they may cause a person distress, in which case such beliefs may be clinically evaluated and diagnosed as a psychiatric disorder.

When studied as a psychiatric disorder in clinical settings, grandiose delusions have been found to commonly occur with other disorders, including in two-thirds of patients in a manic state of bipolar disorder, half of those with schizophrenia, patients with the grandiose subtype of delusional disorder, frequently as a comorbid condition in narcissistic personality disorder, and a substantial portion of those with substance abuse disorders.

== Signs and symptoms ==
According to the DSM-IV-TR diagnostic criteria for delusional disorders, grandiose-type symptoms include exaggerated beliefs of:

- self-worth
- power
- knowledge
- identity
- exceptional relationship to a deity or famous person.

For example, someone who has extraordinary beliefs about their power or authority may believe themselves to be a ruling monarch who deserves to be treated like royalty. There are substantial differences in the degree of grandiosity linked with grandiose delusions in different people. Some patients believe they are God, the King of the United Kingdom, a president's son, a famous rock star, a great hero, and some other examples. Others are not as expansive and think they are skilled athletes or great inventors.

Expansive delusions may be maintained by auditory hallucinations, which advise the patient that they are significant, or confabulations, when, for example, the patient gives a thorough description of their coronation or marriage to the king. Grandiose and expansive delusions may also be part of fantastic hallucinosis in which all forms of hallucinations occur.

=== Positive functions ===
Grandiose delusions frequently serve a very positive function by sustaining or increasing a person's self-esteem. As a result, it is essential to consider the consequences of removing the grandiose delusion on self-esteem when trying to modify the grandiose delusion in therapy. In many instances of grandiosity, it is suitable to go for a fractional rather than a total modification, which permits those elements of the delusion that are central for self-esteem to be preserved. For example, a person who believes they are a senior secret service agent gains a great sense of self-esteem and purpose from this belief, thus until this sense of self-esteem can be provided from elsewhere, it is best not to attempt modification.

In a case study of more than 13,000 non-clinical and almost 3,000 clinical participants, Isham et al. found that the primary sources of meaning derived from grandiose delusions were:

- Confidence in the self
- Overcoming adversity
- The "greater good"
- Happiness
- Supporting loved ones
- Positive social perception
- Spirituality

=== Comorbidity ===
==== Schizophrenia ====
Schizophrenia is a mental disorder distinguished by a loss of contact with reality and the occurrence of psychotic behaviors, including hallucinations and delusions (unreal beliefs which endure even when there is contrary evidence). Delusions may include the false and constant idea that the person is being followed or poisoned, or that the person's thoughts are being broadcast for others to listen to. Delusions in schizophrenia often develop as a response to the individual attempting to explain their hallucinations. Patients who experience recurrent auditory hallucinations can develop the delusion that other people are scheming against them and are dishonest when they say they do not hear the voices that the delusional person believes that he or she hears.

Specifically, grandiose delusions are frequently found in paranoid schizophrenia, in which a person has an extremely exaggerated sense of their significance, personality, knowledge, or authority. For example, the person may declare to be the owner of a major corporation and kindly offer to write a hospital staff member a check for $5 million if they only help them escape from the hospital. Other common grandiose delusions in schizophrenia include religious delusions such as the belief that one is Jesus Christ, or the Mahdi of the end times in Muslim societies.

==== Bipolar disorder ====
Bipolar I disorder can lead to severe affective dysregulation, or mood states that sway from exceedingly low (depression) to exceptionally high (mania). In hypomania or mania, some bipolar patients can have grandiose delusions. In its most severe manifestation, days without sleep, auditory and other hallucinations, or uncontrollable racing thoughts can reinforce these delusions. In mania, this illness affects emotions and can also lead to impulsivity and disorganized thinking, which can be harnessed to increase their sense of grandiosity. Protecting this delusion can also lead to extreme irritability, paranoia, and fear. Sometimes their anxiety can be so over-blown that they believe others are jealous of them and, thus, undermine their "extraordinary abilities," persecuting them or even scheming to seize what they already have.

The vast majority of bipolar patients rarely experience delusions. Typically, when experiencing or displaying a stage of heightened excitability called mania, they can experience joy, rage, and other intense emotions that can cycle out of control, along with thoughts or beliefs that are grandiose. Some of these grandiose thoughts can be expressed as strong beliefs that the patient is very rich or famous or has super-human abilities, or can even lead to severe suicidal ideations. In the most severe form, in what was formerly labeled as megalomania, the bipolar patient may hear voices that support these grandiose beliefs. In their delusions, they can believe that they are, for example, a monarch, a creative genius, or even someone who can exterminate the world's poverty because of their extreme generosity.

== Theories and mechanisms ==
Psychologists and psychiatrists have proposed multiple theoretical accounts of GDs:

- Delusion-as-defense: defense of the mind against lower self-esteem and depression.
- Emotion-consistent: result of exaggerated positive emotions.

Empirical evidence largely supports emotion-consistent models, but also suggests additional factors like reasoning biases. Grandiose delusions are usually associated with high self-esteem and self-serving attributional style and low levels of depression, anxiety and negative self-evaluation. Moreover, there is evidence that repetitive positive self-thinking can confer temporary increases in (non-delusional) grandiose ideas of own superiority, importance or uniqueness. A functional magnetic resonance imaging (fMRI) study of patients with bipolar disorder found that such thinking is associated with exaggerated connectivity between the medial prefrontal cortex and anterior cingulate cortex (brain regions involved in self-relevant information-processing).

Qualitative research likewise indicates that grandiose delusions, far from occurring against a backdrop of negative self-evaluation, conferred a sense of uniqueness, purpose, and belonging, and added meaning to adverse events.

The defensive hypothesis bears a strong similarity to the psychodynamic mask model of non-delusional narcissistic grandiosity, which is also unsupported by the evidence.

== Neurobiology ==
Grandiose delusions may be related to lesions of the frontal lobe. Temporal lobe lesions have been mainly reported in patients with delusions of persecution and of guilt, while frontal and frontotemporal involvement have been described in patients with grandiose delusions, Cotard's syndrome, and delusional misidentification syndrome.

Some studies indicate that GDs are associated with abnormalities in dopaminergic reward pathways and other limbic structures associated with reward and emotion processing. GDs seem to be related to impaired connectivity between the left middle temporal gyrus and more dorsal regions of the left temporal lobe, regions forming a central hub of the default mode network and mediating a variety of cognitive functions (namely social and linguistic ones).

== Diagnosis ==
Patients with a wide range of mental disorders which disturb brain function experience different kinds of delusions, including grandiose delusions. Grandiose delusions usually occur in patients with syndromes associated with secondary mania, such as Huntington's disease, Parkinson's disease, and Wilson's disease. Secondary mania has also been caused by substances such as L-DOPA and isoniazid which modify the monoaminergic neurotransmitter function. Vitamin B12 deficiency, uremia, hyperthyroidism as well as the carcinoid syndrome have been found to cause secondary mania, and thus grandiose delusions.

In diagnosing delusions, the MacArthur-Maudsley Assessment of Delusions Schedule is used to assess the patient.

== Treatment ==
In patients with schizophrenia, grandiose and religious delusions are found to be the least susceptible to cognitive behavioral interventions. Cognitive behavioral intervention is a form of psychological therapy, initially used for depression, but currently used for a variety of different mental disorders, in hope of providing relief from distress and disability. During therapy, grandiose delusions were linked to patients' underlying beliefs by using inference chaining. Some examples of interventions performed to improve the patient's state were focus on specific themes, clarification of patient's neologisms, and thought linkage. During thought linkage, the patient is asked repeatedly by the therapist to explain his/her jumps in thought from one subject to a completely different one.

Patients with mental disorders that experience grandiose delusions have been found to have a lower risk of having suicidal thoughts and attempts.

== Epidemiology ==
In a study of over 1000 individuals of a vast range of backgrounds, Stompe and colleagues (2006) found that grandiosity remains the second most common delusion after persecutory delusions. The prevalence of grandiosity delusions in schizophrenic patients has also been observed to vary cross-culturally. In research done by Appelbaum et al. it has been found that GDs appeared more commonly in patients with bipolar disorder (59%) than in patients with schizophrenia (49%), followed by presence in substance misuse disorder patients (30%) and depressed patients (21%).

A relationship has been claimed between the age of onset of bipolar disorder and the occurrence of GDs. According to Carlson et al. (2000), grandiose delusions appeared in 74% of the patients who were 21 or younger at the time of the onset, while they occurred only in 40% of individuals 30 years or older at the time of the onset.

=== Prevalence ===
Research suggests that the severity of the delusions of grandeur is directly related to higher self-esteem and inversely related to severity of depression and negative self-evaluations. Lucas et al. found, in 1962, that there is no significant gender difference in the establishment of grandiose delusion. However, the particular content of religious Grandiose delusions is variable across genders, with men more likely to consider themselves to be God, whereas women are more likely to consider themselves to be saints. Lucas et al also noted that grandiose delusions are more prevalent in people with greater education. Similarly, the presence of grandiose delusions in individuals who are the eldest is greater than in individuals who are the youngest of their siblings.

== See also ==
- God complex
- Illusory superiority
- Messiah complex
- Put on airs
- Dunning–Kruger effect
- Haughtiness
- Hubris
- Icarus complex
- Overconfidence effect
- Vanity
- Chūnibyō
