= Marking your own homework =

Mark(ing) your own homework (where "your" is often substituted with "their", "one's", "its", "his" or "her") is a British expression used in political discourse, the study of organisational behaviour and in everyday life. The expression implies that whenever a person or group self-assesses and/or self regulates their own work they will usually treat it more favorably than if it were assessed by an independent person or group.

== Examples ==
- UK MPs have been criticised for marking their own homework by self-regulating their own expense claims and behaviour.
- Lord Justice Leveson said the Press Complaints Commission had failed and must be replaced. Newspapers should not be allowed to mark their own homework.
- UK Home Secretary and former prime minister Theresa May said, in the context of a perceived lack of diversity in fire and rescue crews, "It is not so much marking your own homework as setting your own exam paper and resolving that you've passed – and it has to change."
- According to UK MP Ann Clwyd, hospitals in the UK are still marking their own homework. Many hospitals do not yet have clear protocols about how complaints are handled and investigated.
- The Scottish health regulator, Healthcare Improvement Scotland, has itself been accused of marking its own homework.
- The CQC said, in the context of a proposal to introduce coregulation of NHS health providers to encourage them to develop their own systems and processes for understanding quality, it will be able to protect against providers marking their own homework by checking self-assessments against its own data.

== See also ==
- Collective narcissism
- Homework
- In-group favoritism
- Self-serving bias
