= Worse-than-average effect =

Cognitive bias

The worse-than-average effect or below-average effect is the human tendency to underestimate one's achievements and capabilities in relation to others.

It is the opposite of the usually pervasive better-than-average effect (in contexts where the two are compared or the overconfidence effect in other situations). It has been proposed more recently to explain reversals of that effect, where people instead underestimate their own desirable traits.

This effect seems to occur when chances of success are perceived to be extremely rare. Traits which people tend to underestimate include juggling ability, the ability to ride a unicycle, the odds of living past 100 or of finding a U.S. twenty dollar bill on the ground in the next two weeks.

Some have attempted to explain this cognitive bias in terms of the regression fallacy or of self-handicapping. In a 2012 article in Psychological Bulletin it is suggested the worse-than-average effect (as well as other cognitive biases) can be explained by a simple information-theoretic generative mechanism that assumes a noisy conversion of objective evidence (observation) into subjective estimates (judgment).

The worse-than-average effect appears to depend on how difficult people find a task. In 2022, a replication of Kruger’s 1999 study found that people rated themselves above average on easy abilities, such as using a computer mouse or driving, but below average on harder ones, such as playing chess. The effects were smaller than in the original study. The authors also noted that the wish to see oneself as superior cannot explain why people rate themselves below average on difficult tasks.

== See also ==
- Dunning–Kruger effect
- List of cognitive biases
