= Optimism bias =

Type of cognitive bias

Optimism bias is the tendency of an individual to overestimate the likelihood of positive events and underestimate that of negative events.

A cognitive bias, the optimistic bias is common across cultures, genders, ethnicities, nationalities, and age groups. It has implications to individual and group decision making, public health, policy, economics, and law.

The extent of optimism bias depends on a person's overall mood, their desired end state, the information they have about themselves and others, and their cognitive mechanisms. Generally, the optimism bias is stronger for underestimating negative events than overestimating positive events.

It is also known as unrealistic optimism, comparative optimism, and optimist's delusion.

== Operationalisation, methodology, and theory ==
Optimism bias is typically measured through two determinants of risk: absolute risk, where individuals are asked to estimate their likelihood of experiencing a negative event, and comparative risk, where individuals are asked to estimate the likelihood of experiencing a negative event compared to others of the same age and sex. Problems can occur when trying to measure absolute risk, because it is difficult to determine the actual risk statistic for a person and compare it against their personal estimate.

Direct comparisons ask whether an individual's own risk of experiencing an event is less than, greater than, or equal to someone else's risk. Indirect comparisons ask individuals to provide separate estimates of their own risk and that of others in experiencing the same event.

After obtaining scores, researchers use the information to determine if there is a difference in the average risk estimate of the individual compared to the average risk estimate of their peers. Generally, in negative events, the mean risk of an individual appears lower than the risk estimate of others. This is then used to demonstrate the bias' effect.

Optimistic bias can only be defined and measured at a group level, because at an individual level the positive assessment could be true. Likewise, difficulties can arise in measurement procedures, as it is difficult to determine when someone is being optimistic, realistic, or pessimistic. Research suggests that the bias comes from an overestimate of group risks rather than underestimating one's own risk.

=== Valence effects ===
The valence effect refers to the influence of positive or negative framing on unrealistic optimism. Since 2003, Ron S. Gold and colleagues have studied this phenomenon by presenting the same event in different ways. For example, some participants receive information about conditions that promote a health-related event, such as developing heart disease, and are asked to rate the likelihood of experiencing it. Others receive matched information about conditions that prevent the same event and are asked to rate the likelihood of avoiding it. Their findings consistently show that unrealistic optimism is greater when events are framed with negative valence than with positive valence.

=== Neuroscience ===
Functional neuroimaging suggests a key role for the rostral Anterior Cingulate Cortex (ACC) in modulating both emotional processing and autobiographical retrieval. It is part of brain network showing extensive correlation between rostral ACC and amygdala during imagining of future positive events and restricted correlation during imagining of future negative events. Based on these data, it is suggested that the rostral ACC has a crucial part to play in creating positive images of the future and ultimately, in ensuring and maintaining the optimism bias.

It has also been reported in other animals, such as rats and birds.

== Controlling factors ==
Factors leading to the optimistic bias can be categorized into four different groups: desired end states of comparative judgment; cognitive mechanisms; information about the self versus a target; and underlying affect.

=== Desired end states of comparative judgment ===
Many explanations for the optimistic bias come from the goals that people want and outcomes they wish to see.

==== Self-enhancement ====
Self-enhancement theories suggest that optimistic predictions are satisfying, that it feels good to think that positive events will happen, and that people can control their anxiety and other negative emotions if they believe they are better off than others. As such, the theory predicts that people tend to focus on finding information that supports what they want to see happen. This also suggests that people might lower their risks compared to others to make themselves look better than average, a form of self-presentation.

==== Self-presentation ====
Self-presentation theories suggest that people unconsciously attempt to establish and maintain a desired personal image in social situations, and that the optimistic bias is a representative of self-presentational processes. Studies also suggest that individuals who present themselves in a pessimistic and more negative light are generally less accepted by the rest of society.

==== Personal control/perceived control ====
People tend to be more optimistically biased when they believe they have more control over events than others. Studies have suggested that the greater perceived control someone has, the greater their optimistic bias. Stemming from this, control is a stronger factor when it comes to personal risk assessments, but not when assessing others.

The relationship between the optimistic bias and perceived control is moderated by a number of factors, such as nationality, age, occupation, research methodology, and situation. An opposing factor to perceived control is prior experience. Prior experience is typically associated with less optimistic bias; some studies suggest this is from a decrease in the perception of personal control, or by making it easier for individuals to imagine themselves at risk.

In public health and safety contexts, people are more likely to think that they will not be harmed in a car accident if they are driving the vehicle. Someone believes that they have a lot of control over becoming infected with HIV, they are more likely to view their risk of contracting the disease to be low.

=== Cognitive mechanisms ===
The optimistic bias is possibly also influenced by cognitive mechanisms that guide judgments and decision-making processes.

==== Representativeness heuristic ====
Likelihood estimates linked to optimistic bias often depend on how closely an event matches a person's mental model of that event. Some researchers suggest the representativeness heuristic underlies this bias; people tend to rely on stereotypes in decision making, relying upon specific examples that relate directly to what they are asked rather than an average example.

==== Singular target focus ====
One of the difficulties of the optimistic bias is that people know more about themselves than they do about others. While individuals know how to think about themselves as a single person, they still think of others as a generalized group, which leads to biased estimates and inabilities to sufficiently understand their target or comparison group. Likewise, when making judgments and comparisons about their risk compared to others, people generally ignore the average person, but primarily focus on their own feelings and experiences.

==== Interpersonal distance ====
Perceived risk differences increase with the perceived interpersonal distance between self and target. Closer targets produce more similar risk estimates, while distant ones amplify differences. Studies show that in-group comparisons yield greater perceived similarity than out-group comparisons. People within an in-group not only tend to more readily work with each other initially but also display closer perceived risk differences than when comparing themselves to out-groups. Optimistic bias is also stronger when the target is vague or unfamiliar, and weaker when it is a known person such as a friend or family member, though this may also reflect the greater information available about close others.

=== Information about self versus target ===
Individuals know a lot more about themselves than they do about others. Because information about others is less available, information about the self versus others leads people to make specific conclusions about their own risk, but results in them having a harder time making conclusions about the risks of others. This leads to differences in judgments and conclusions about self-risks compared to the risks of others, leading to larger gaps in the optimistic bias.

==== Person-positivity bias ====
Person-positivity bias is the tendency to evaluate an object more favorably the more the object resembles an individual human being. Generally, the more a comparison target resembles a specific person, the more familiar it will be. Groups of people are considered to be more abstract concepts, which leads to less favorable judgments. With regards to the optimistic bias, when people compare themselves to an average person, whether someone of the same sex or age, the target continues to be viewed as less human and less personified, which will result in less favorable comparisons between the self and others.

==== Egocentric thinking ====
Egocentric thinking refers to how individuals know more of their own personal information and risk that they can use to form judgments and make decisions. One difficulty, though, is that people have a large amount of knowledge about themselves, but no knowledge about others. Therefore, when making decisions, people have to use other information available to them, such as population data, in order to learn more about their comparison group. This can relate to an optimism bias because while people are using the available information they have about themselves, they have more difficulty understanding correct information about others.

It is also possible that someone can escape egocentric thinking. In one study, researchers had one group of participants list all factors that influenced their chances of experiencing a variety of events, and then a second group read the list. Those who read the list showed less optimistic bias in their own reports. It's possible that greater knowledge about others and their perceptions of their chances of risk bring the comparison group closer to the participant.

==== Underestimating average person's control ====
It is also possible that individuals underestimate the amount of control the average person has. This is explained in two different ways: First, that people underestimate the control that others have in their lives; second, that people completely overlook that others have control over their own outcomes.

=== Underlying affect ===
The last factor of optimistic bias is that of underlying affect and affect experience. Research has found that people show less optimistic bias when experiencing a negative mood, and more optimistic bias when in a positive mood. Sad moods reflect greater memories of negative events, which lead to more negative judgments, while positive moods promote happy memories and more positive feelings. This suggests that overall negative moods, including depression, result in increased personal risk estimates but less optimistic bias overall. Anxiety also leads to less optimistic bias, continuing to suggest that overall positive experiences and positive attitudes lead to more optimistic bias in events.

== Applications ==
=== Public health ===
In public health contexts, optimistic bias can discourage individuals from adopting preventive measures.

People who underestimate their comparative risk of heart disease tend to know less about the condition and, even after reading informative material, remain less concerned about their risk. Risk perception plays a significant role in behaviors such as exercise, diet, and sunscreen use. Prevention efforts often focus on adolescents, a group with a high incidence of risky health-related behaviors including smoking, drug use, and unsafe sex. Although adolescents are generally aware of these risks, awareness alone rarely alters habits. Moreover, adolescents with a strong positive optimistic bias toward risky behaviors tend to show an increase in such bias with age.

Methodological issues complicate the study prevention in public health. Cross-sectional studies frequently use unconditional risk questions, which ask about the likelihood of an event without clarifying outcomes or distinguishing between events that have and have not occurred. Such designs limit interpretability. Similarly, vaccine studies often compare perceptions of vaccinated and unvaccinated individuals without first assessing each participant's underlying perception of risk.

=== Mental health ===
Autistic people are less susceptible to this kind of bias.

Pessimism bias is an effect in which people exaggerate the likelihood that negative things will happen to them. People with depression are particularly likely to exhibit pessimism bias. Surveys of smokers have found that their ratings of their risk of heart disease showed a small but significant pessimism bias; the literature as a whole is inconclusive.

=== Management and public policy ===
Optimism bias influences decisions and forecasts in policy, planning, and management. The planning fallacy, that is, that costs and completion times of planned decisions tend to be underestimated and the benefits overestimated, was first proposed by Daniel Kahneman and Amos Tversky. There is a growing body of evidence proving that optimism bias represents one of the biggest single causes of risk for megaproject overspend.

Valence effects also have notable real-world implications. In finance, they can lead investors to overestimate a company's future earnings, potentially inflating stock prices. In organizational contexts, they may foster overly ambitious schedules, contributing to the planning fallacy and increasing the risk of poor decisions or project abandonment.

=== Debiasing ===
Studies have shown that it is very difficult to eliminate the optimistic bias. While some scholars argue that mitigating the bias could promote health-protective behaviors, experimental evidence suggests that attempts to reduce it often intensify the effect. In one study testing four interventions of reducing optimism bias, all four measures increased rather than decreased bias. Other research has attempted to reduce optimistic bias by decreasing perceived distance between self and comparison targets, but with limited overall success.

Although eliminating optimistic bias entirely appears challenging, certain conditions can attenuate it. Reducing social distance—such as comparing oneself to close friends rather than strangers—has been shown to narrow or even eliminate differences in perceived likelihood of events. Direct experience with an event also reduces optimistic bias.

== See also ==
- Depressive realism – Hypothesis about depression
- Illusion of control – False belief in an ability to control events
- Illusory superiority – Cognitive bias
- Normalcy bias – Disbelief or minimization in response to threat warnings
- Nothing to hide argument – Argument against surveillance
- Negativity bias – Tendency to give more importance to negative experiences than positive ones
- Pollyanna principle – Tendency to remember pleasant things better
- Positive illusions – Unrealistically favorable attitudes
- Reference class forecasting – Method of predicting the future
- Self-serving bias – Distortion to enhance self-esteem, or to see oneself overly favorably
- Toxic positivity – Construct in psychology
- Wishful thinking – Formation of beliefs based on what might be pleasing to imagine
- List of cognitive biases

== Bibliography ==
- Rosenhan, David; Messick, Samuel (1966). "Affect and expectation" (PDF). Journal of Personality and Social Psychology. 3 (1): 38–44. doi:10.1037/h0022633. PMID 5902075. Archived from the original (PDF) on 2016-05-24.
- Taylor, Nigel (2000). Making Actuaries Less Human. Staple Inn Actuarial Society, 15. For picking a card see section 6.2 on page 15.
