= Illusory superiority =

Cognitive bias

In social psychology, illusory superiority is a cognitive bias wherein people overestimate their own qualities and abilities compared to others. Illusory superiority is one of many positive illusions, relating to the self, that are evident in the study of intelligence, the effective performance of tasks and tests, and the possession of desirable personal characteristics and personality traits. Overestimation of abilities compared to an objective measure is known as the overconfidence effect.

The term "illusory superiority" was first used by the researchers Van Yperen and Buunk, in 1991. The phenomenon is also known as the above-average effect, the superiority bias, the leniency error, the sense of relative superiority, the primus inter pares effect, and the Lake Wobegon effect, named after the fictional town where all the children are above average. The Dunning-Kruger effect is a form of illusory superiority shown by people on a task where their level of skill is low.

Most of the literature on illusory superiority is from studies on participants in the US. However, research that only investigates the effects in one specific population is severely limited as this may not be a true representation of human psychology. More recent research investigating self-esteem in other countries suggests that illusory superiority depends on culture. Some studies indicate that East Asians tend to underestimate their own abilities in order to improve themselves and get along with others.

== Explanations ==
=== Better-than-average heuristic ===
Alicke and Govorun proposed the idea that, rather than individuals consciously reviewing and thinking about their own abilities, behaviors and characteristics and comparing them to those of others, it is likely that people instead have what they describe as an "automatic tendency to assimilate positively-evaluated social objects toward ideal trait conceptions". For example, if an individual evaluated themselves as honest, they would be likely to then exaggerate their characteristic towards their perceived ideal position on a scale of honesty. Importantly, Alicke noted that this ideal position is not always the top of the scale; for example, with honesty, someone who is always brutally honest may be regarded as rude—the ideal is a balance, perceived differently by different individuals.

=== Egocentrism ===
Another explanation for how the better-than-average effect works is egocentrism. This is the idea that an individual places greater importance and significance on their own abilities, characteristics, and behaviors than those of others. Egocentrism is therefore a less overtly self-serving bias. According to egocentrism, individuals will overestimate themselves in relation to others because they believe that they have an advantage that others do not have, as an individual considering their own performance and another's performance will consider their performance to be better, even when they are in fact equal. Kruger (1999) found support for the egocentrism explanation in his research involving participant ratings of their ability on easy and difficult tasks. It was found that individuals were consistent in their ratings of themselves as above the median in the tasks classified as "easy" and below the median in the tasks classified as "difficult", regardless of their actual ability. In this experiment the better-than-average effect was observed when it was suggested to participants that they would be successful, but also a worse-than-average effect was found when it was suggested that participants would be unsuccessful.

=== Focalism ===
Yet another explanation for the better-than-average effect is "focalism", the idea that greater significance is placed on the object that is the focus of attention. Most studies of the better-than-average effect place greater focus on the self when asking participants to make comparisons (the question will often be phrased with the self being presented before the comparison target—"compare yourself to the average person"). According to focalism this means that the individual will place greater significance on their own ability or characteristic than that of the comparison target. This also means that in theory if, in an experiment on the better-than-average effect, the questions were phrased so that the self and other were switched (e.g., "compare the average peer to yourself") the better-than-average effect should be lessened.

Research into focalism has concentrated primarily on optimistic bias rather than the better-than-average effect. However, two studies found a decreased effect of optimistic bias when participants were asked to compare an average peer to themselves, rather than themselves to an average peer.

Windschitl, Kruger & Simms (2003) have conducted research into focalism, focusing specifically on the better-than-average effect, and found that asking participants to estimate their ability and likelihood of success in a task produced results of decreased estimations when they were asked about others' chances of success rather than their own.

=== Noisy mental information processing ===
A 2012 Psychological Bulletin suggests that illusory superiority, as well as other biases, can be explained by an information-theoretic generative mechanism that assumes observation (a noisy conversion of objective evidence) into subjective estimates (judgment).

Since mental noise is a sufficient explanation that is much simpler and more straightforward than any other explanation involving heuristics, behavior, or social interaction, the Occam's razor principle argues in its favor as the underlying generative mechanism (it is the hypothesis which makes the fewest assumptions).

=== Selective recruitment ===
Selective recruitment is the notion that an individual selects their own strengths and the other's weaknesses when making peer comparisons, in order that they appear better on the whole. This theory was first tested by Weinstein (1980); however, this was in an experiment relating to optimistic bias, rather than the better-than-average effect. The study involved participants rating certain behaviors as likely to increase or decrease the chance of a series of life events happening to them. It was found that individuals showed less optimistic bias when they were allowed to see others' answers.

Perloff and Fetzer (1986) suggested that when making peer comparisons on a specific characteristic, an individual chooses a comparison target—the peer to whom he is being compared—with lower abilities. To test this theory, Perloff and Fetzer asked participants to compare themselves to specific comparison targets like a close friend, and found that illusory superiority decreased when they were told to envision a specific person rather than vague constructs like "the average peer". However, these results are not completely reliable and could be affected by the fact that individuals like their close friends more than an "average peer" and may as a result rate their friend as being higher than average, therefore the friend would not be an objective comparison target.

=== "Self versus aggregate" comparisons ===
This idea, put forward by Giladi and Klar, suggests that when making comparisons any single member of a group will tend to evaluate themselves to rank above that group's statistical mean performance level or the median performance level of its members. For example, if an individual is asked to assess their own skill at driving compared to the rest of the group, they are likely to rate themself as an above-average driver. Furthermore, the majority of the group is likely to rate themselves as above average. Research has found this effect in many different areas of human performance and has even generalized it beyond individuals' attempts to draw comparisons involving themselves.

=== Non-social explanations ===
The better-than-average effect may not have wholly social origins—judgments about inanimate objects suffer similar distortions.

== Neuroimaging ==
The degree to which people view themselves as more desirable than the average person links to reduced activation in their orbitofrontal cortex and dorsal anterior cingulate cortex. This is suggested to link to the role of these areas in processing "cognitive control".

== Effects in different situations ==
Illusory superiority has been found in individuals' comparisons of themselves with others in a variety of aspects of life, including performance in academic circumstances (such as class performance, exams and overall intelligence), in working environments (for example in job performance), and in social settings (for example in estimating one's popularity, or the extent to which one possesses desirable personality traits, such as honesty or confidence), and in everyday abilities requiring particular skill.

A further problem in inferring inconsistency is that subjects might interpret the question in different ways, so it is logically possible that a majority of them are, for example, more generous than the rest of the group each on "their own understanding" of generosity. This interpretation is confirmed by experiments which varied the amount of interpretive freedom. As subjects evaluated themselves on a specific, well-defined attribute, illusory superiority remains.

=== Academic ability, job performance, lawsuits going to trial, and stock trading ===
In a survey of faculty at the University of Nebraska–Lincoln, 68% rated themselves in the top 25% for teaching ability, and 94% rated themselves as above average.

In a similar survey, 87% of Master of Business Administration students at Stanford University rated their academic performance as above the median. Another study showed that employees routinely overstate their level of professional knowledge by 20% compared to that of their coworkers.

Illusory superiority has also explained phenomena such as the large amount of stock market trading (as each trader thinks they are the best, and most likely to succeed), and the number of lawsuits that go to trial (because, due to illusory superiority, many lawyers have an inflated belief that they will win a case).

=== Cognitive tasks ===
In Kruger and Dunning's experiments, participants were given specific tasks (such as solving logic problems, analyzing grammar questions, and determining whether jokes were funny), and were asked to evaluate their performance on these tasks relative to the rest of the group, enabling a direct comparison of their actual and perceived performance.

Results were divided into four groups depending on actual performance and it was found that all four groups evaluated their performance as above average, meaning that the lowest-scoring group (the bottom 25%) showed a very large illusory superiority bias. The researchers attributed this to the fact that the individuals who were worst at performing the tasks were also worst at recognizing skill in those tasks. This was supported by the fact that, given training, the worst subjects improved their estimate of their rank as well as getting better at the tasks. The paper, titled "Unskilled and Unaware of It: How Difficulties in Recognizing One's Own Incompetence Lead to Inflated Self-Assessments", won an Ig Nobel Prize in 2000.

In 2003, Dunning and Joyce Ehrlinger, also of Cornell University, published a study that detailed a shift in people's views of themselves influenced by external cues. Cornell undergraduates were given tests of their knowledge of geography, some intended to positively affect their self-views, others intended to affect them negatively. They were then asked to rate their performance, and those given the positive tests reported significantly better performance than those given the negative.

Daniel Ames and Lara Kammrath extended this work to sensitivity to others, and the subjects' perception of how sensitive they were. Research by Burson, Larrick, and Klayman suggests that the effect is not so obvious and may be due to noise and bias levels.

Dunning, Kruger, and coauthors' 2008 paper on this subject comes to qualitatively similar conclusions after making some attempt to test alternative explanations.

=== Driving ability ===
Svenson (1981) surveyed 161 students in Sweden and the United States, asking them to compare their driving skills and safety to other people's. For driving skills, 93% of the U.S. sample and 69% of the Swedish sample put themselves in the top 50%; for safety, 88% of the U.S. and 77% of the Swedish put themselves in the top 50%.

McCormick, Walkey and Green (1986) found similar results in their study, asking 178 participants to evaluate their position on eight different dimensions of driving skills (examples include the "dangerous–safe" dimension and the "considerate–inconsiderate" dimension). Only a small minority rated themselves as below the median, and when all eight dimensions were considered together it was found that almost 80% of participants had evaluated themselves as being an above-average driver.

One commercial survey showed that 36% of drivers believed they were an above-average driver while texting or sending emails compared to other drivers; 44% considered themselves average, and 18% below average.

=== Health ===
Illusory superiority was found in a self-report study of health behaviors (Hoorens & Harris, 1998) that asked participants to estimate how often they and their peers carried out healthy and unhealthy behaviors. Participants reported that they carried out healthy behaviors more often than the average peer, and unhealthy behaviors less often. The findings held even for expected future behavior.

=== Immunity to bias ===
Subjects describe themselves in positive terms compared to other people, and this includes describing themselves as less susceptible to bias than other people. This effect is called the "bias blind spot" and has been demonstrated independently.

=== IQ ===
Illusory superiority that applies to IQ is known as the "Downing effect". This describes the tendency of people with a below-average IQ to overestimate their IQ, and of people with an above-average IQ to underestimate their IQ (similar trend to the Dunning-Kruger effect). This tendency was first observed by C. L. Downing, who conducted the first cross-cultural studies on perceived intelligence. His studies also showed that the ability to accurately estimate other people's IQs was proportional to one's own IQ (i.e., the lower the IQ, the less capable of accurately appraising other people's IQs). People with high IQs are better overall at appraising other people's IQs, but when asked about the IQs of people with similar IQs as themselves, they are likely to rate them as having higher IQs.

The disparity between actual IQ and perceived IQ has also been noted between genders by British psychologist Adrian Furnham, in whose work there was a suggestion that, on average, men are more likely to overestimate their intelligence by 5 points, while women are more likely to underestimate their IQ by a similar margin.

=== Memory ===
Illusory superiority has been found in studies comparing memory self-reports, such as Schmidt, Berg & Deelman's research in older adults. This study involved participants aged between 46 and 89 years of age comparing their own memory to that of peers of the same age group, 25-year-olds and their own memory at age 25. This research showed that participants exhibited illusory superiority when comparing themselves to both peers and younger adults, however the researchers asserted that these judgments were only slightly related to age.

=== Popularity ===
In Zuckerman and Jost's study, participants were given detailed questionnaires about their friendships and asked to assess their own popularity. Using social network analysis, they were able to show that participants generally had exaggerated perceptions of their own popularity, especially in comparison to their own friends.

Despite the fact that most people in the study believed that they had more friends than their friends, a 1991 study by sociologist Scott L. Feld on the friendship paradox shows that on average, due to sampling bias, most people have fewer friends than their friends have.

=== Relationship happiness ===
Researchers have also found illusory superiority in relationship satisfaction. For example, one study found that participants perceived their own relationships as better than others' relationships on average, but thought that the majority of people were happy with their relationships. It also found evidence that the higher the participants rated their own relationship happiness, the more superior they believed their relationship was—illusory superiority also increased their own relationship satisfaction. This effect was pronounced in men, whose satisfaction was especially related to the perception that one's own relationship was superior as well as to the assumption that few others were unhappy in their relationships. On the other hand, women's satisfaction was particularly related to the assumption that most people were happy with their relationship.

=== Self, friends, and peers ===
One of the first studies that found illusory superiority was carried out in the United States by the College Board in 1976.

A 2002 study on illusory superiority in social settings, with participants comparing themselves to friends and other peers on positive characteristics (such as punctuality and sensitivity) and negative characteristics (such as naivety or inconsistency). This study found that participants rated themselves more favorably than their friends, but rated their friends more favorably than other peers (but there were several moderating factors).

Research by Perloff and Fetzer, Brown, and Henri Tajfel and John C. Turner also found friends being rated higher than other peers. Tajfel and Turner attributed this to an "ingroup bias" and suggested that this was motivated by the individual's desire for a "positive social identity".

== Moderating factors ==
While illusory superiority has been found to be somewhat self-serving, this does not mean that it will predictably occur—it is not constant. The strength of the effect is moderated by many factors, the main examples of which have been summarized by Alicke and Govorun (2005).

=== Interpretability/ambiguity of trait ===
This is a phenomenon that Alicke and Govorun have described as "the nature of the judgement dimension" and refers to how subjective (abstract) or objective (concrete) the ability or characteristic being evaluated is. Research by Sedikides & Strube (1997) has found that people are more self-serving (the effect of illusory superiority is stronger) when the event in question is more open to interpretation, for example social constructs such as popularity and attractiveness are more interpretable than characteristics such as intelligence and physical ability. This has been partly attributed also to the need for a believable self-view.

The idea that ambiguity moderates illusory superiority has empirical research support from a study involving two conditions: in one, participants were given criteria for assessing a trait as ambiguous or unambiguous, and in the other participants were free to assess the traits according to their own criteria. It was found that the effect of illusory superiority was greater in the condition where participants were free to assess the traits.

The effects of illusory superiority have also been found to be strongest when people rate themselves on abilities at which they are totally incompetent. These subjects have the greatest disparity between their actual performance (at the low end of the distribution) and their self-rating (placing themselves above average). This Dunning–Kruger effect is interpreted as a lack of metacognitive ability to recognize their own incompetence.

=== Method of comparison ===
The method used in research into illusory superiority has been found to have an implication on the strength of the effect found. Most studies into illusory superiority involve a comparison between an individual and an average peer, of which there are two methods: direct comparison and indirect comparison. A direct comparison—which is more commonly used—involves the participant rating themselves and the average peer on the same scale, from "below average" to "above average" and results in participants being far more self-serving.

The indirect method of comparison involves participants rating themselves and the average peer on separate scales and the illusory superiority effect is found by taking the average peer score away from the individual's score (with a higher score indicating a greater effect). While the indirect comparison method is used less often it is more informative in terms of whether participants have overestimated themselves or underestimated the average peer, and can therefore provide more information about the nature of illusory superiority.

=== Comparison target ===
First, research into illusory superiority is distinct in terms of the comparison target because an individual compares themselves with a hypothetical average peer rather than a tangible person. Alicke et al. (1995) found that the effect of illusory superiority was still present but was significantly reduced when participants compared themselves with real people (also participants in the experiment, who were seated in the same room), as opposed to when participants compared themselves with an average peer. This suggests that research into illusory superiority may itself be biasing results and finding a greater effect than would actually occur in real life.

Second, Alicke et al.'s (1995) studies investigated whether the negative connotations to the word "average" may have an effect on the extent to which individuals exhibit illusory superiority, namely whether the use of the word "average" increases illusory superiority. Participants were asked to evaluate themselves, the average peer and a person whom they had sat next to in the previous experiment, on various dimensions. It was found that they placed themselves highest, followed by the real person, followed by the average peer, however the average peer was consistently placed above the mean point on the scale, suggesting that the word "average" did not have a negative effect on the participant's view of the average peer.

=== Controllability ===
An important moderating factor of the effect of illusory superiority is the extent to which an individual believes they are able to control and change their position on the dimension concerned. According to Alicke & Govorun positive characteristics that an individual believes are within their control are more self-serving, and negative characteristics that are seen as uncontrollable are less detrimental to self-enhancement.

=== Individual differences of judge ===
Personality characteristics vary widely between people and have been found to moderate the effects of illusory superiority, one of the main examples of this is self-esteem. Brown (1986) found that in self-evaluations of positive characteristics participants with higher self-esteem showed greater illusory superiority bias than participants with lower self-esteem. Additionally, another study found that participants pre-classified as having high self-esteem tended to interpret ambiguous traits in a self-serving way, whereas participants pre-classified as having low self-esteem did not do this.

== Relation to mental health ==
Psychology has traditionally assumed that generally accurate self-perceptions are essential to good mental health. This was challenged by a 1988 paper by Taylor and Brown, who argued that mentally healthy individuals typically manifest three cognitive illusions—illusory superiority, illusion of control, and optimism bias. This idea rapidly became very influential, with some authorities concluding that it would be therapeutic to deliberately induce these biases. Since then, further research has both undermined that conclusion and offered new evidence associating illusory superiority with negative effects on the individual.

One line of argument was that in the Taylor and Brown paper, the classification of people as mentally healthy or unhealthy was based on self-reports rather than objective criteria. People prone to self-enhancement would exaggerate how well-adjusted they are. One study claimed that "mentally normal" groups were contaminated by "defensive deniers", who are the most subject to positive illusions. A longitudinal study found that self-enhancement biases were associated with poor social skills and psychological maladjustment. In a separate experiment where videotaped conversations between men and women were rated by independent observers, self-enhancing individuals were more likely to show socially problematic behaviors such as hostility or irritability. A 2007 study found that self-enhancement biases were associated with psychological benefits (such as subjective well-being) but also inter- and intra-personal costs (such as anti-social behavior).

== Worse-than-average effect ==
In contrast to what is commonly believed, research has found that better-than-average effects are not universal. In fact, much recent research has found the opposite effect in many tasks, especially if they were more difficult.

== Self-esteem ==
Illusory superiority's relationship with self-esteem is uncertain. The theory that those with high self-esteem maintain this high level by rating themselves highly is not without merit—studies involving non-depressed college students found that they thought they had more control over positive outcomes compared to their peers, even when controlling for performance. Non-depressed students also actively rate peers below themselves as opposed to rating themselves higher. Students were able to recall a great deal more negative personality traits about others than about themselves.

In these studies there was no distinction made between people with legitimate and illegitimate high self-esteem, as other studies have found that absence of positive illusions mainly coexist with high self-esteem and that determined individuals bent on growth and learning are less prone to these illusions.

== See also ==
- Anosognosia
- Fundamental attribution error
- Impostor syndrome
- Introspection illusion
- List of cognitive biases
- Looking glass self
- Narcissism
- Pollyanna principle
- Put on airs
- Self-efficacy
- Self-help
- Self-licensing
- Self-monitoring
- Self-serving bias
- Superiority complex
