= Willy-nilly (idiom) =

Idiom meaning disorganized or disorderly

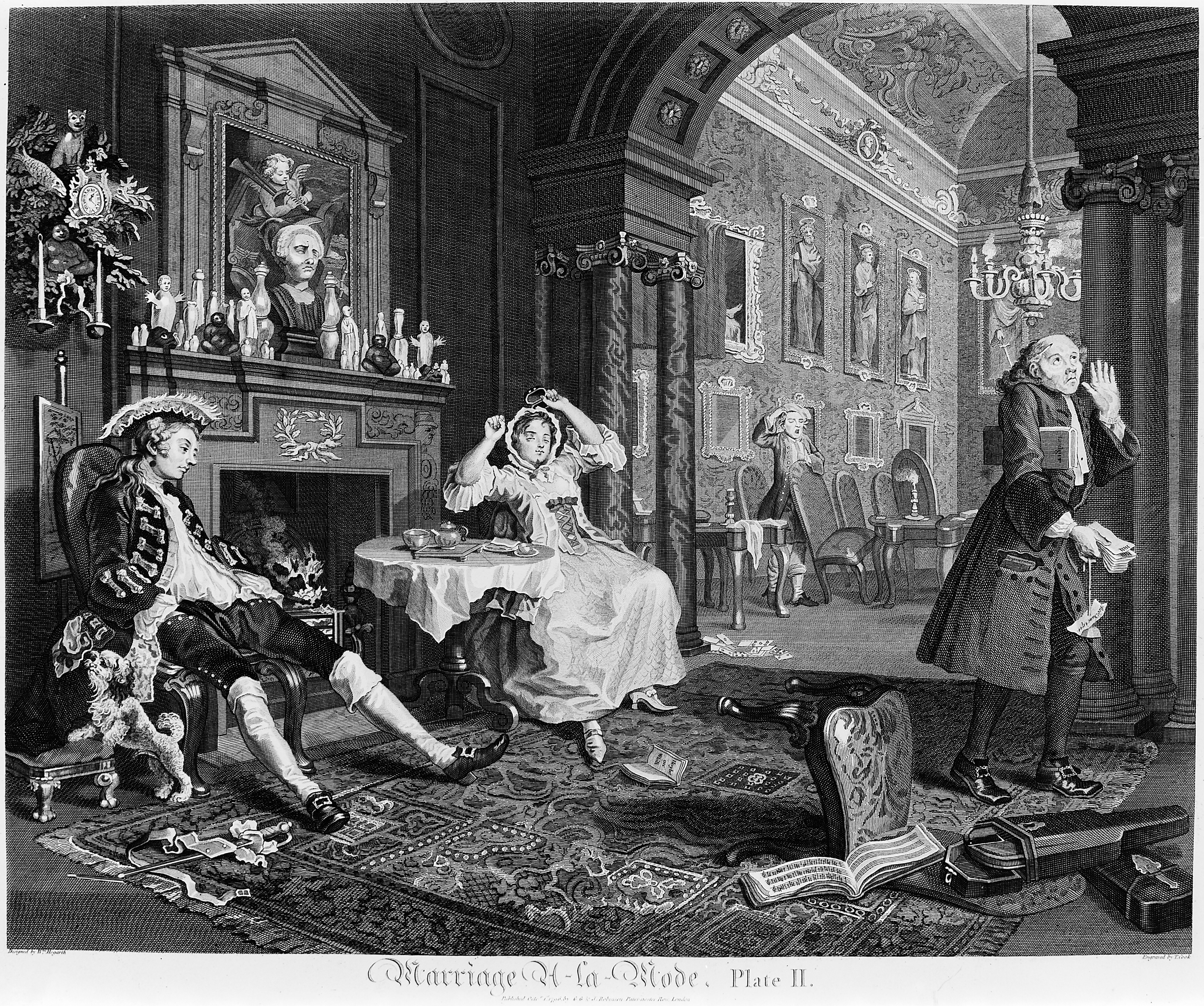
An 18th century artwork by William Hogarth featuring a disorderly setting.

Willy-nilly is an English-language idiom and slang which describes an activity, an action or event that is done in a disorganized, unplanned, or vacillating manner. The term is derived from Shakespearian expression "will ye, nill ye", which is a contraction that means “whether one wants to or not.”

It has a very similar meaning to other reduplicates, that also pertain to 'disorderly' and 'disorganized', such as pell-mell, helter-skelter, hurry-scurry and higgledy-piggledy, (Note: Unlike willy-nilly, these words have an implication of haste, confusion and hurriedness.) all originating in the post-medieval period. (Note: Pell-mell (1570's); Helter-skelter (1590's); Hurry-scurry (1732); Higgledy-piggledy (1590's).) Moreover, the idiomatic phrase to-and-fro (and its gerund toing-and-froing), which originate in the 1820s, also have a similar sense of repetitive movement, instability and vacillation.

== History ==
=== Origins ===
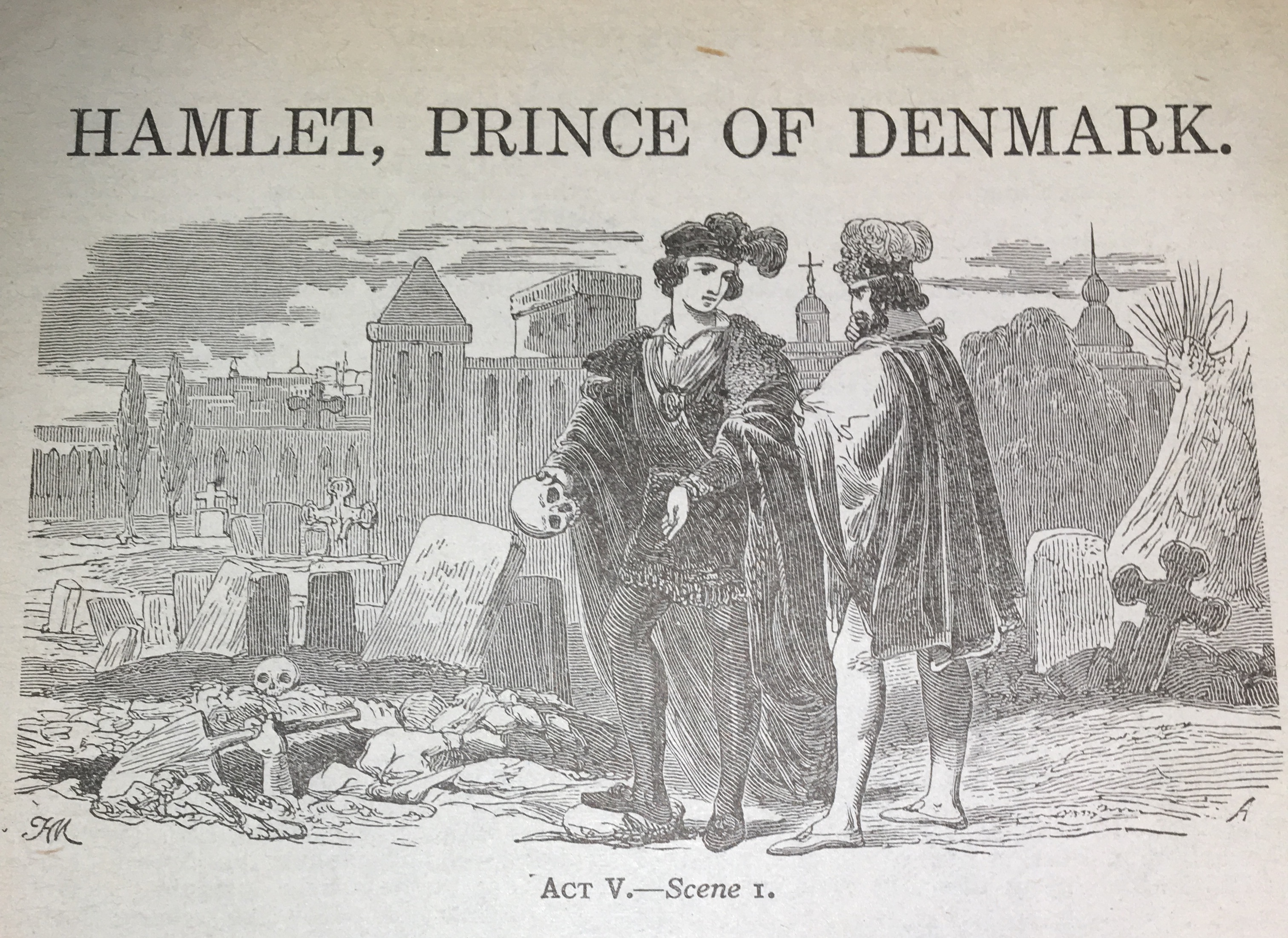
The term was popularized from Shakespeare's Hamlet (1599-1601).

The earliest ancestor of "willy-nilly" is the Old English, "sam we willan sam we nyllan" ('whether we wish to or wish not to'), found in King Ælfred's translation of De Consolatione Philosophiæ in 888 AD. The expression will ye, nill ye (which means 'will you or won't you') was first attested in an 11th century hagiography, Aelfric's Lives of Saints (c. 950–c. 1010): “Forean the we synd synfulle and sceolan beon eadmode, wille we, nelle we.” In the 14th century, an inversed version of the idiom, "Nil we, wil we" ('one way or another') appeared in the Middle English language.

In the 1590's, an equivalent Latin expression nolens volens showed up. The term may have been an influence to 'willy-nilly', as it was developed from two Latin participles that have the definition, "unwilling, willing". William Shakespeare first used a form of this expression in The Taming of the Shrew in 1596 (And, Will you, nill you, I will marry you) in Early Modern English. Though the expression "will ye, nill ye" became notable from Hamlet, Act V, Scene I, “If the man go to this water and drown himself, it is, will he nill he, he goes - mark you that.”

=== Modern usage ===
The Oxford English Dictionary notes the first appearance of willy-nilly, in its modernity, from 1608, which meant "whether one wants to or not". The earliest example when "willy-nilly" was spelled in the modern form was from Salmagundi in 1807, written by Washington Irving and others.

Edward FitzGerald's 1859 translation of The Rubaiyat of Omar Khayyam featured the first usage of 'willy-nilly' in its modern definition of haphazardness; "Into this Universe, and why not knowing, Nor whence, like Water willy-nilly flowing". The archaic definition of the idiom that pertained to indecisiveness appeared in Sir Walter Besant's novel The Orange Girl in 1898; "Let us have no more shilly shally, willy nilly talk", which later spawned the term 'shilly-shally'. The term 'william-nilliam' has been used humorously in the early 20th century.

== Definition ==
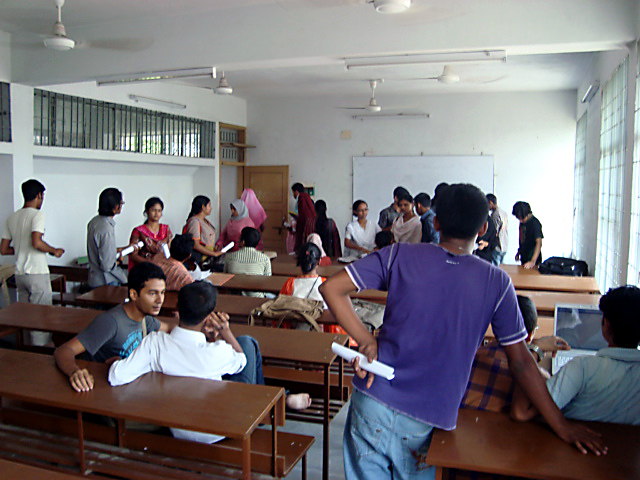
"Class today was willy-nilly", meaning all over the place and unorganized.

The idiom has two different, albeit similar meanings; "with or against one's will" and "in an unplanned or haphazard fashion". In modern times, the latter meaning is used more frequently and the former has become archaic, although the former meaning has roots to its origin. Furthermore, both definitions lead to the idea of something being out of one's control, and therefore haphazard.

An informal adverb and an adjective, willy-nilly can be used to describe a situation, action, decision, or event that happens or is done haphazardly, randomly, carelessly, chaotically, and without planning, direction or order. Simply put, it pertains to the instability, vacillation and the ineffectiveness of a person's actions or movement. The expression adds a somewhat humorous element to any statement a speaker or writer can make (e.g. "the children ran around the playground willy-nilly without a care in the world").

=== Evolution ===
The archaic definition of will I, nill I, a contraction of "be I willing, be I unwilling", was that no matter what the person feels, they are obliged with doing it. Later, the meaning implicated that a person was unsure whether to perform an action, such as being undecided. From the 19th century, the expression began to be generally defined as somebody starting a task without direction, planning, or is performed in a chaotic way.

== Arabic ==
In Kuwaiti, the slang term "khirri mirri" (خِرِّي مِرِّي/خري مري) is an old expression that generally pertains to 'chaos' and 'disorderly', as the two Arabic words symbolize lack of control and binding. (Note: "Khiri" means something that falls. "Miri" pertains to something or someone that passes by.) Moreover, in Iraqi Arabic and Saudi Arabic, "khiri miri" is used to describe a situation where a person repetitively enters and leaves, or goes and returns (usually without permission or order). (Note: The closest English equivalent for the Iraqi and Saudi Arabic definition is the aforementioned toing and froing.)

== See also ==
- Randomness
