= Perceived control =

Psychological concept

In psychology, an individual's perceived control (PC) is the degree to which they believe that they have control over themselves and the place, people, things, feelings and activities surrounding them. There are two important dimensions: (1) whether the object of control is in the past or the future and (2) whether the object of control is over an outcome, behavior, or process.

== History ==
The cognitive revolution which was completed around the 1940s significantly changed psychology. Being influenced by the ideas of Pavlov and other physiologists, scientists turned their interest in direction of the observable. Away from subjectivity, the objective investigation of behavior became trustworthy and allocable. This revolution helped developing fields of the study of perceived control. Goal-seeking and human motivation became important in many theories. In 1959, Robert W. White introduced a theory of "effectance motivation", in which human drive for control is explained through an innate need to be able to handle a situation and the obtainment of control over the environment.

In 1966, Julian Rotter published "Generalized Expectancies for Internal versus External Control of Reinforcement”, in which the term "perceived control" was first used. His work influenced multiple disciplines, including psychology, sociology, economics and health care. After his publication, the scientific work on his concept of perceived internal control differed mostly into two branches. One believed perceived control to be a fixed personality trait, and therefore refers to concepts like self-efficacy and competence, the other spoke about perceived control as a cognitive process, influenced from environmental clues that could be manipulated systematically. This relates to concepts as illusion of control, learned helplessness and mindfullness.

“A series of studies provide strong support for the hypotheses that the individual who has a strong belief that he (sic) can control his own destiny is likely to be alert to those aspects of the environment, which provide useful information for his future behavior; (b) take steps to improve his environmental condition; (c) place greater value on skill or achievement of reinforcements and be generally more concerned with his ability, particularly his failures; and (d) be resistive to subtle attempts to influence him.” Rotter 1966

From this perspective perceived control can either be seen as a personality trait or a cognitive processing, which in either case enhances functioning and survival.

=== Historical research ===
In the year 1975, Martin E.P. Seligman coined the term "learned helplessness". In Terms of perceived control, Seligman's term of "learned helplessness" described that the perceived control of a situation leads to a specific outcome of behavior. Seligman confronted dogs with a situation accompanied by a total lack of perceived control, which ultimately lead the dogs to give into the situation. They learned passiveness, helplessness. Seligman transferred his experiments to humans, speculating that perceived control is related to the development of, for instance, depression.

Research by Schulz and Hansua on Perceived Control focuses on the causal relationships between one's own control and his psychological and physiological well-being and not only on the correlation of these factors. In a study done in 1978, pensioners living in a retirement home participants were about to gain control or lose control. They could either decide themselves when they wanted students to visit them or had no influence on scheduling the student's visit. The results show that pensioners who have control over when they will be having visitors felt better and were healthier than pensioners in the "no influence"-group. This study describes perceived control as a cognitive process that manipulates the person's health and motivation.

Therefore, self-efficacy is an important factor influencing the effectiveness of perceived control. Blittner, Goldberg and Merbaum reasoned in 1978 that only if the person believes in their abilities and success, they can perform better or change behavior.

A study by Sastry and Ross in 1998 concluded that there are cultural differences on perceived control, too. According to the researchers, perceived control is seen as more important by people living in Western Countries than by Asians. Additionally, Asians do not make an association between perceived control and mental well-being. This difference is explained by different focuses of the cultures. Western Culture appreciates individualism and personal success which leads the people to feel the urge of controlling the own process and performance. People are more likely to understand perceived control as a personality trait.

== Scientific models ==
=== Two-process model of perceived control ===
The "two-process model of perceived control" was first proposed by Rothbaum, Weisz and Snyder. According to the two-process model, people attempt to gain control not only by bringing the environment into line with their wishes (primary control) but also by bringing their own wishes into line with environmental forces (secondary control).

Four manifestations of secondary control are considered:

1. Attributions to severely limited ability can serve to enhance predictive control and to protect against disappointment.
2. Attributions to chance can reflect illusory control since people often construe chance as a personal characteristic akin to an ability ("luck").
3. Attributions to powerful others permit vicarious control when the individual identifies with these others.
4. All of the preceding attributions may foster interpretive control, in which the individual seeks to understand and derive meaning from otherwise uncontrollable events in order to accept them.

=== Four-factor model of perceived control ===
In December 1989, Fred B. Bryant published his research, introducing his “four-factor model of perceived control”. He referred to the two-process model proposed by Rothbaum et al. which states that people’s controlling responses are classified as either attempts to change the world (i.e., primary control) or attempts to change oneself to fit in with the world (i.e., secondary control). Bryant added two more factors to that model; positive and negative experience. He explained that perceived control results from a self-evaluation of one’s ability to:

- Avoiding – Primary-Negative Control

Avoiding, according to Bryant, is defined as “the perceived ability to avoid negative outcomes”. It is dependent on (1) the degree of personal control over bad things, (2) the frequency with which bad things occur, and (3) the likelihood of bad things occurring.

- Coping – Secondary-Negative Control

Coping is defined as “the perceived ability to cope with negative outcomes”. It is dependent on (1) the ability to cope with bad things, (2) how much one is bothered by bad things, and (3) how long bad things affect one’s feelings for.

- Obtaining – Primary-Positive Control

Obtaining is defined as “the perceived ability to obtain positive outcomes”. It is dependent on (1) the degree of personal control over good things, (2) the personal responsibility for good things, (3) the frequency with which good things occur, and (4) the likelihood of good things occurring.

- Savouring – Secondary-Positive Control

Savouring is defined as “the perceived ability to savor positive outcomes”. It is dependent on (1) the ability to enjoy good things, (2) how much one is pleased by good things, (3) how long good things affect one’s feelings for, (4) the frequency of 'feeling on top of the world', and (5) the frequency of feeling overjoyed.

== Applications and clinical perspective ==
In a study conducted by Wallston et al. (1997), it was stated that perceived control can influence health in two conscious forms: health behavior (e.g., eating healthy) and health status (e.g. obesity). Furthermore, perceived control can also affect health in an unconscious way by impacting the physiological processes directly, as proven by Rodin (1986). He states that internal events such as unpredictability and loss of control can affect catecholamine, neurohormonal and immune changes.

Wallston et al. go on explaining that there is also a connection between the locus of control and perceived control on health outcomes. Loci of control, a concept developed by Julian B. Rotter in 1954, says that a person can attribute certain events in their life internally, as they themselves being responsible for them, or externally, as outside sources being accountable for them. A study in 1984 endeavoured to see if individual differences in loci of control correlated with the amount of exercise tolerance and health status criteria in pulmonary disease patients. The results showed that health-internals with higher perceived control and efficacy had higher exercise tolerance and, in turn, better overall health. On the other hand, there was no relationship between efficacy beliefs and outcomes in the case of health-externals.

There have also been several studies about the relationship between perceived control and cancer. A cancer diagnosis can greatly reduce the a patient's perceived control. Maintenance of control after a diagnosis has been found to correlate with lower levels of psychological distress in months following the diagnosis, indicating that maintained perceptions of control are "beneficial to the psychological adjustment to cancer".
