= Control (psychology) =

How a person regulates themselves or wishes to regulate their environment

In psychology, control is a person's ability or perception of their ability to affect themselves, others, their conditions, their environment or some other circumstance. Control over oneself or others can extend to the regulation of emotions, thoughts, actions, impulses, memory, attention or experiences. There are several types of control, including:

- Perceived control (a person's perception of their own control and abilities to achieve outcomes)
- Desired control (the amount of control one seeks within a relationship or other circumstance)
- Cognitive control (the ability to select one's thoughts and actions)
- Emotional control (the ability to regulate one's feelings or attitudes toward something)
- Motivational control (one's ability to act on prescribed behaviors)
- Inhibitory control (the ability to inhibit thoughts or actions in favor of others)
- Social control (selecting one's environment for personal benefit)
- Ego control (the attempt to regulate impulses or attention processes)
- Effortful control (the ability to regulate how much effort one invests into a goal)

== Perceived control ==
Perceived control in psychology is a "person's belief that [they are] capable of obtaining desired outcomes, avoiding undesired outcomes, and achieving goals." High perceived control is often associated with better health, relationships, and adjustment. Strategies for restoring perceived control are called 'compensatory control strategies'. One's perception of perceived control is influenced by the past and future as well as what the desired outcome of an event may be. Perceived control is often associated with the term locus of control. Perceived control can be affected by two processes: primary and secondary control. Primary control consists of attempting to change the environment to align with one's own wishes, whereas secondary perceived refers to the act of attempting to gain control by changing one's wishes to reflect what exists or is achievable within the environment.

== Desired control ==
Desired control is the degree of influence that an individual desires over any subject, circumstance, or relationship. This can apply to romantic, non-romantic, professional, and sales contexts. Desired control is often associated with perceived control, and studies focused on individuals with a lower desire for control show a correlation with greater psychological problems.

== Cognitive control ==
Cognitive control is "the ability to control one's thoughts and actions." It is also known as controlled processing, executive attention, and supervisory attention. Controlled behaviors - behaviors over which one has cognitive control - are guided by maintenance, updating, and representing task goals, and inhibiting information irrelevant to the task goal. Cognitive control is often developed through reinforcement as well as learning from previous experiences. Increased cognitive control allows individuals to have increased flexibility in their ability to choose between conflicting stimuli. Cognitive control is commonly tested using the Stroop color-word task as well as the Eriksen flanker task.

There are certain quirks of cognitive control, such as ironic rebound, in which attempts to keep a particular thought out of consciousness result in that thought becoming increasingly prevalent. In social psychology experiments conducted by Daniel M. Wegner, Ralph Erber and R.E. Bowman, male and female subjects were instructed to complete some sentences related to sexism. Some participants were given guidance to avoid being sexist, whereas some were not given such instructions. Additionally, for some sentence completions, time pressure was either applied by asking for immediate responses or reduced by giving subjects ten seconds to respond. Under low-pressure conditions with guidance to avoid being sexist, the number of sexist completions were lower than the much higher number of sexist completions that resulted when subjects were under time pressure along with guidance to avoid being sexist. Furthermore, these results were consistent among both male and female subjects. This highlights the effect of ironic rebound: when the individuals attempted not to be sexist under a significant time constraint, their resulting actions were counter to their attempts at cognitive control.

== Emotional control ==
Emotional control is a term from literature on self-regulatory psychology and refers to "the ability to self-manage or regulate attitudes and feelings that directly affect participant receptiveness to, and implementation of, training activities." Emotional control is often referred to as emotional regulation and is the process the brain undergoes to regulate and control emotional responses throughout the day. Emotional control manages and balances the physiological as well as psychological response to an emotion. The opposite of emotion regulation is emotional dysregulation which occurs when problems arise in the emotional control process that result in the inability to process emotions in a healthy manner. Emotional control contains several emotional regulation strategies including distraction, cognitive reappraisal, and emotional action control.

== Motivational control ==
Motivational control is "the self-regulatory mechanism by which individuals are able to act on prescribed behaviors to implement ... activities." In other words, it is the capability of an individual to act on intentional reasoning, rather than out of emotion or impulse. For example, a student may study for an hour each morning for two months before a test, despite not enjoying studying, in order to improve their results.

== Inhibitory control ==
Inhibitory control (IC) is another type of self-regulation: "the ability to inhibit prepotent thoughts or actions flexibly, often in favor of a subdominant action, typically in goal-directed behavior". There are two types of inhibitory control: hot and cold. Hot IC involves activities or tasks related to emotional regulation, and cold IC involves abstract activities or tasks. A lack of inhibitory control can lead to difficulties in motor, attentional, and behavioral control. Inhibitory control is also involved in the process of helping humans correct, react, and improve social behavior.

A lack of inhibitory control can be connected with several mental disorders including behavioral inhibition, attention deficit hyperactivity disorder (ADHD), and obsessive-compulsive disorder (OCD). Alcohol and drugs also influence one's inhibitory control.

== Social control ==
In learning psychology, social control refers to "an individual's skills in engaging the social environment in ways that help to support and reinforce his or her learning activities." Social control can be influenced by several factors including the control that society places on individual actions and behaviors as well as the control an individual can exert over their own behaviors in public. The definition of social control has changed over time to include the social control groups of people have in addition to individuals.

== Ego control ==
'Ego control' describes the efforts of an individual to control "thoughts, emotions, impulses or appetites... task performances [and] attentional processes." Failure of ego control is seen as a central problem in individuals who have substance abuse disorders.

== Situational control ==
In leadership psychology, situational control is "the degree to which the situation provides the leader with potential influence over the group's behavior". Situational favourableness or situational control describes a person's ability to persuade or control the group situation, or the degree in which the person(s) is able to influence the behavior(s) of group members to face a current situation. The qualities, characteristics, and skills of a leader are required to persuade a group situation by a large extent by the demands of the situation. Several more factors can be placed upon situational control, such as leadership style and commitment and competitiveness of the leader.

== Effortful control ==
Effortful control is a type of self-regulation. It is a broader construct than inhibitory control, and encompasses working memory and attention-shifting. Effortful control works by allowing individuals the ability to start or stop behaviors they may or may not want to perform through attention management. Effortful control is theorized to be involved in the process of problem solving as well as behavior regulation due to the top-down processing involved. Effortful control often interacts with and is central in other forms of control such as emotional control and inhibitory control.

== See also ==
- Self control
- Self-regulation (disambiguation)
- Ego depletion
- Self-management
- Self-monitoring
- Locus of control
