= Industry self-regulation =

Self-monitoring of adherence to standards

Industry self-regulation is the process whereby members of an industry, trade, or sector of the economy implement, monitor, and enforce their own legal, ethical, or safety standards. This contrasts both with government regulation and with self-control within individual firms. Compared with government regulation, industry self-regulation may be faster, cheaper, more flexible, and more sensitive to market conditions, and it may ease compliance and encourage ownership of standards. But it may also be weak, ineffective, or secretive, and may give rise to in-group favoritism, conflicts of interest, and regulatory capture. The effectiveness of self-regulation may depend heavily on an industry's ability to produce normative standards with strong monitoring, reporting, and data analysis.

== Role of government ==
An outside, independent governmental agency or other third-party entity often, but not always, has a supervisory role, if only shadow supervision. For this reason, some scholars describe much industry self-regulation as co-regulation. Between "pure" industry self-regulation, which is relatively rare, and "pure" governmental regulation, which began to be de-emphasized in the 1980s and 1990s, scholars have proposed various intermediate types of self-regulation. Joseph Rees (1988) distinguished three subtypes: voluntary self-regulation, mandated self-regulation, and mandated self-regulation combined with governmental regulation (where self-regulation handles either rulemaking or enforcement, and government regulation handles the other).

=== Self-regulatory organizations (SROs) ===
In 1994, the Administrative Conference of the United States (ACUS) defined audited self-regulation as government delegation to a private self-regulatory organization, with the government retaining powers of supervision, review, and independent enforcement. Audited self-regulation is informally sometimes referred to as statutory self-regulation. Examples include the private, mandatory-membership Financial Industry Regulatory Authority (FINRA), which is overseen by the US Securities and Exchange Commission (SEC), and the private North American Electric Reliability Corporation, which is overseen by the Federal Energy Regulatory Commission (FERC) under the Energy Policy Act of 2005.

== Advantages and disadvantages ==
An organization can maintain control over its governing standards by successfully self-regulating. If it can keep the public from becoming aware of internal problems, this also preempts the need for a public relations campaign to repair such damage. The cost of setting up an external enforcement mechanism is avoided. If the self-regulation can avoid reputational damage and related risks to all actors in the industry, this would be a powerful incentive for proactive self-regulation.

If any organization, such as a corporation or government bureaucracy, is asked to eliminate unethical behavior within its own group, it may be in the group's interest in the short run to eliminate the appearance of unethical behavior, rather than the behavior itself, by keeping any ethical breaches hidden, instead of exposing and correcting them. An exception occurs when the ethical breach is already known by the public, in which case it could be in the group's interest to end the ethical problem about which the public has knowledge, while keeping other breaches hidden.

Attempts at self-regulation may well fail, due to the inherent conflict of interest in asking any organization to police itself. If the public becomes aware of this failure, an external, independent organization is often given the duty of policing members, sometimes with highly punitive measures taken against an organization. The results can be disastrous, such as a military with no external, independent oversight, which may commit human rights violations against the public. Not all businesses will voluntarily meet best-practice standards, leaving some users exposed.

Self-regulation may succeed in industry sectors with varied membership, such as international brands together with small and medium-size companies where the brand owners would have an interest to protect the joint sector reputation by issuing together self-regulation so as to avoid smaller companies with fewer resources causing damage out of ignorance. Similarly, the reliability of a professional group such as lawyers or journalists could make ethical rules work satisfactorily as self-regulation if they were a precondition for admitting new members.

Governments may prefer to allow an industry to regulate itself but maintain a watching brief over the effectiveness of self-regulation and be willing to introduce external regulation if necessary. For example, in the UK, the House of Commons Public Accounts Committee in 2015 investigated the role of large accountancy firms in relation to tax avoidance and argued that "Government needs to take a more active role in regulating the tax industry, as it evidently cannot be trusted to regulate itself".

== Organizations ==
When directly self-regulating, the organization directly monitors and punishes its own members. For example, many small organizations have the ability to remove any member by a vote of all members. Another common form is where the organization establishes an external policing organization. However, if this organization is established and controlled by the parent organization, it cannot be considered independent. In another form, the organization sets up a committee or division for policing the remainder of the organization. The House Ethics Committee is an example in the United States government, while various police departments employ an Internal Affairs division to perform a similar function.

- The American Bar Association (ABA) formulates model ethical codes related to the legal profession. The ABA had nearly 400,000 members in 2015, but 227,000 by 2024.
- State bar associations in the U.S. are either mandatory (aka "unified") or voluntary, with only mandatory bar associations performing regulatory functions, which can vary by state.
- The American Advertising Federation (AAF), the American Association of Advertising Agencies (AAAA), the Association of National Advertisers (ANA), and the Interactive Advertising Bureau (IAB) together work with the National Advertising Division (NAD) to establish and enforce guidance related to truth in advertising for national advertising.
- The Direct Selling Association (DSA) is a voluntary self-regulator that is monitored by the independent, third-party Direct Selling Self-Regulatory Council (DSSRC), which establishes and enforces guidance for the direct-selling industry.
- FINRA is a self-regulatory organization that regulates brokerage firms and exchange markets in the financial industry under statutory supervision by the SEC.

== Within organizations ==
Self-regulation is the process whereby an organization is asked, or volunteers, to monitor its own adherence to legal, ethical, or safety standards, rather than having an outside, independent agency such as a governmental entity monitor and enforce those standards. Self-regulation can help specify existing guidelines or laws in certain contexts, foremost in technical fields such as environmental protection and biotechnology, but also in business and trade. Self-regulatory measures such as codes of conduct can have important indirect legal relevance based on their effect of creating legal certainty and a waiver of liability in civil law, labor law and even criminal law.

Some regulators reward firm-level self-regulation. Under the US Environmental Agency's Audit Policy, penalties are reduced for violations that a company itself discovers, discloses, and corrects.

== See also ==
- Bar association
- Conflict of interest
- Ethical code
- Marking your own homework
- Professional association
- Professional conduct
- Self-regulatory organization
