= Hold your horses =

English language idiom meaning to wait

"Hold your horses", sometimes said as "Hold the horses", is an English-language idiom meaning "wait, slow down". The phrase is historically related to horse riding or travelling by horse, or driving a horse-drawn vehicle. A number of explanations, all unverified, have been offered for the origins of the phrase, dating back to usage in Ancient Greece.

The saying is typically used when someone is rushing into something. "Cool your jets" is an essentially identical idiom. However it also has a more literal meaning and in certain circumstances is the preferred idiom to use. "Hold your horses" literally means to keep your horse(s) still, not to be confused with holding them in a stable. Someone is to slow down when going too fast, or to wait a moment, or to be more careful, or to be patient before acting.

It is usually followed up with an explanation to demonstrate why you should wait. For example, "Hold your horses, we have not won yet, so don't start celebrating." and "Hold your horses, you haven't thought about this yet" or "Hold your horses, you might find a better one for the same price in another store" or "Hold your horses. We're almost there."

== Origins ==
There are several sources documenting the usage of "hold your horses"

  - In Book 23 of the Iliad, Homer writes "Hold your horses!" when referring to Antilochus driving like a maniac in a chariot race that Achilles initiates in the funeral games for Patroclus.
  - During the noise of battle, a Roman soldier would hold his horses.
  - After the invention of gunpowder, the Chinese would have to hold their horses because of the noise.
- Idiomatic meaning:
  - A 19th-century United States origin, where it was written as 'hold your hosses' ("hoss" being a US slang term for horse) and appears in print that way many times from 1843 onwards. It is also the first attested usage in the idiomatic meaning. Example: from Picayune (New Orleans) in September 1844, "Oh, hold your hosses, Squire. There's no use gettin' riled, no how."
  - In Chatelaine, 1939, the modern spelling arises: "Hold your horses, dear."
  - The term may have originated from army artillery units. Example: Hunt and Pringle's Service Slang (1943) quotes "Hold your horses, hold the job until further orders".
  - Dave Chappelle used the figurative term on his show towards Jim Brewer in a marijuana commercial
  - Other explanations come from its relation to stability and maintaining stability.
