= Self-actualization =

Human emotional need

Self-actualization, in Maslow's hierarchy of needs, is the highest personal aspirational human need in the hierarchy. It represents where one's potential is fully realized after more basic needs, such as for the body and the ego, have been fulfilled, and is recognised in psychological teaching as the peak of human needs. Maslow later added the category self-transcendence (which, strictly speaking, extends beyond one's own "needs").

Self-actualization was coined by the organismic theorist Kurt Goldstein for the motive to realize one's full potential: "the tendency to actualize itself as fully as [...] the drive of self-actualization." Carl Rogers similarly wrote of "the curative force in psychotherapy – man's tendency to actualize himself, to become his potentialities [...] to express and activate all the capacities of the organism."

== Abraham Maslow's theory ==
=== Definition ===
Maslow defined self-actualization to be "self-fulfillment", namely the tendency for them [the individual] to become actualized in what they are potentially. This tendency might be phrased as the desire to become more and more what one is, to become everything that one is capable of becoming. He used the term to describe a desire, not a driving force, that could lead to realizing one's capabilities. He did not feel that self-actualization determined one's life; rather, he felt that it gave the individual a desire, or motivation to achieve budding ambitions. Maslow's idea of self-actualization has been commonly interpreted as "the full realization of one's potential" and of one's "true self."

A more explicit definition of self-actualization according to Maslow is "intrinsic growth of what is already in the organism, or more accurately of what is the organism itself ... self-actualization is growth-motivated rather than deficiency-motivated." This explanation emphasizes the fact that self-actualization cannot normally be reached until other lower order necessities of Maslow's hierarchy of needs are satisfied. While Goldstein defined self-actualization as a driving force, Maslow uses the term to describe personal growth that takes place once lower order needs have essentially been met, one corollary being that, in his opinion, "self-actualisation ... rarely happens ... certainly in less than 1% of the adult population." The fact that "most of us function most of the time on a level lower than that of self-actualization" he called the psychopathology of normality.

Maslow's usage of the term is now popular in modern psychology when discussing personality from the humanistic approach.

=== History and development of the concept ===
Maslow's work is considered to be part of humanistic psychology, which is one of several frameworks used in psychology for studying, understanding, and evaluating personality. The humanistic approach was developed because other approaches, such as the psychodynamic approach made famous by Sigmund Freud, focused on unhealthy individuals that exhibited disturbed behavior; whereas the humanistic approach focuses on healthy, motivated people and tries to determine how they define the self while maximizing their potential. Humanistic psychology in general and self-actualisation in particular helped change our view of human nature from a negative point of view – man is a conditioned or tension reducing organism – to a more positive view in which man is motivated to realize his full potential. This is reflected in Maslow's hierarchy of needs and in his theory of self-actualization.

Instead of focusing on what goes wrong with people, Maslow wanted to focus on human potential, and how we fulfill that potential. Maslow (1943, 1954) stated that human motivation is based on people seeking fulfillment and change through personal growth. Self-actualized people are those who are fulfilled and doing all they are capable of. It refers to the person's desire for self-fulfillment, namely to the tendency for him to become actualized in what he is potentially. "The specific form that these needs will take will of course vary greatly from person to person. In one individual it may take the form of the desire to be an ideal mother, in another it may be expressed athletically, and in still another it may be expressed in painting pictures or in inventions."

One of Abraham Maslow's earliest discussions of self-actualization was in his 1943 article "A Theory of Human Motivation" in Psychological Review 50, pp. 370–396.

Here, the concept of self-actualization was first brought to prominence as part of Abraham Maslow's hierarchy of needs theory as the final level of psychological development that can be achieved when all basic and mental needs are essentially fulfilled and the "actualization" of the full personal potential takes place.

In this treatment, self-actualization is at the top of Maslow's hierarchy of needs, and is described as becoming "'fully human' ... maturity or self-actualization."

According to Maslow, people have lower order needs that in general must be fulfilled before high order needs can be satisfied: 'five sets of needs – physiological, safety, belongingness, esteem, and finally self-actualization'.

As Abraham Maslow noted, the basic needs of humans must be met (e.g. food, shelter, warmth, security, sense of belonging) before a person can achieve self-actualization. Yet, Maslow argued that reaching a state of true self-actualization in everyday society was fairly rare. Research shows that when people live lives that are different from their true nature and capabilities, they are less likely to be happy than those whose goals and lives match. For example, someone who has inherent potential to be a great artist or teacher may never realize their talents if their energy is focused on attaining the basic needs of humans. As a person moves up Maslow's hierarchy of needs, they may eventually find themselves reaching the summit — self-actualization. Maslow's hierarchy of needs begins with the most basic necessities deemed "the physiological needs" in which the individual will seek out items like food and water, and must be able to perform basic functions such as breathing and sleeping. Once these needs have been met, a person can move on to fulfilling "the safety needs", where they will attempt to obtain a sense of security, physical comfort and shelter, employment, and property. The next level is "the belongingness and love needs", where people will strive for social acceptance, affiliations, a sense of belongingness and being welcome, sexual intimacy, and perhaps a family. Next are "the esteem needs", where the individual will desire a sense of competence, recognition of achievement by peers, and respect from others.

Once these needs are met, an individual is primed to achieve self-actualization.

While the theory is generally portrayed as a fairly rigid hierarchy, Maslow noted that the order in which these needs are fulfilled does not always follow this standard progression. For example, he notes that for some individuals, the need for self-esteem is more important than the need for love. For others, the need for creative fulfillment may supersede even the most basic needs.

=== Maslow's later-career ideas ===
In his later work, Maslow suggested that there are two additional phases an individual must progress through before achieving self-actualization. These are "the cognitive needs," where a person will desire knowledge and an understanding of the world around them, and "the aesthetic needs," which include a need for "symmetry, order, and beauty."

Maslow also added a further step beyond self-actualization, which is self-transcendence. Self-transcendence occurs at the "very highest and most inclusive or holistic levels of human consciousness."

=== Characteristics of self-actualizers ===
A self-actualizer is a person who is living creatively and fully using their potential. It refers to the desire for self-fulfillment, namely, to the tendency for a person to become actualized in what they are potentially. Maslow based his theory partially on his own assumptions or convictions about human potential and partially on his case studies of historical figures whom he believed to be self-actualized, including Albert Einstein and Henry David Thoreau. He considered self-actualizing people to possess "an unusual ability to detect the spurious, the fake, and the dishonest in personality, and in general to judge people correctly and efficiently." Maslow examined the lives of each of these people in order to assess the common qualities that led each to become self-actualized. In his studies, Maslow found that self-actualizers really do share similarities. He also believed that each of these people had somehow managed to find their core-nature that is unique to them, and is one of the true goals of life. Whether famous or unknown, educated or not, rich or poor, self-actualizers tend to fit the following profile.

Maslow's self-actualizing characteristics are:

- Efficient perceptions of reality. Self-actualizers are able to judge situations correctly and honestly. They are very sensitive to the superficial and dishonest.
- Comfortable acceptance of self, others, and nature. Self-actualizers accept their own human nature with all its flaws. The shortcomings of others and the contradictions of the human condition are accepted with humor and tolerance.
- Reliant on own experiences and judgement. Independent, not reliant on culture and environment to form opinions and views.
- Spontaneous and natural. True to oneself, rather than being how others want.
- Task centering. Most of Maslow's subjects had a mission to fulfill in life or some task or problem 'beyond' themselves (instead of outside themselves) to pursue. Humanitarians such as Albert Schweitzer are considered to have possessed this quality.
- Autonomy. Self-actualizers are free from reliance on external authorities or other people. They tend to be resourceful and independent.
- Continued freshness of appreciation. The self-actualizer seems to constantly renew appreciation of life's basic goods. A sunset or a flower will be experienced as intensely time after time as it was at first. There is an "innocence of vision", like that of a child.
- Profound interpersonal relationships. The interpersonal relationships of self-actualizers are marked by deep loving bonds.
- Comfort with solitude. Despite their satisfying relationships with others, self-actualizing people value solitude and are comfortable being alone.
- Non-hostile sense of humor. This refers to the ability to laugh at oneself.
- Peak experiences. All of Maslow's subjects reported the frequent occurrence of peak experiences (temporary moments of self-actualization). These occasions were marked by feelings of ecstasy, harmony, and deep meaning. Self-actualizers reported feeling at one with the universe, stronger and calmer than ever before, filled with light, beauty, goodness, and so forth.
- Socially compassionate. Possessing humanity.
- Few friends. Few close intimate friends rather than many perfunctory relationships.
- Gemeinschaftsgefühl. According to Maslow, the self-actualizers possess "Gemeinschaftsgefühl", which refers to "social interest, community feeling, or a sense of oneness with all humanity."

=== Discussion ===
Maslow's writings are used as inspirational resources. The key to Maslow's writings is understanding that there are no quick routes to self-actualization: rather it is predicated on the individual having their lower deficiency needs met. Once a person has moved through feeling and believing that they are deficient, they naturally seek to grow into who they are, i.e. self-actualization. Elsewhere, however, Maslow (2011) and Carl Rogers (1980) both suggested necessary attitudes and/or attributes that need to be inside an individual as a pre-requisite for self-actualization. Among these are a real wish to be themselves, to be fully human, to fulfill themselves, and to be completely alive, as well as a willingness to risk being vulnerable and to uncover more "painful" aspects in order to learn about/grow through and integrate these parts of themselves (this has parallels with Jung's slightly similar concept of individuation).

Although their studies were initially biologically centered (or focused around the more ordinary, psychological self-nature), there have been many similarities and cross-references between various spiritual schools or groups (particularly Eastern spiritual ways) in the past 40 years.

Maslow early noted his impression that "impulsivity, the unrestrained expression of any whim, the direct seeking for 'kicks' and for non-social and purely private pleasures...is often mislabelled self-actualization." In this sense, "self-actualization" is little more than what Eric Berne described as the game of '"Self-Expression"...based on the dogma "Feelings are Good"'.

Broader criticism from within humanistic psychology of the concept of self-actualization includes the danger that 'emphasis on the actualizing tendency...can lead to a highly positive view of the human being but one which is strangely non-relational'. According to Fritz Perls there is also the risk of confusing "self-actualizing and self-image actualizing...the curse of the ideal." By conflating "the virtue of self-actualization and the reality of self-actualization," the latter becomes merely another measuring rod for the "topdog" – the nagging conscience: "You tell me to do things. You tell me to be – real. You tell me to be self-actualized...I don't have to be that good!"

Barry Stevens remarks: "Abe Maslow was unhappy with what happened with many people when they read what he wrote about 'self-actualizing people'. What they did with it was very strange. I have received a fair number of letters saying 'I am a self-actualized person'. Maslow said that he must have left something out. Fritz (Perls) put it in. He saw that most people actualized a self-concept. This is not self-actualizing."

== Kurt Goldstein's concept ==
The term "self-actualization" was first used by the German psychiatrist Kurt Goldstein. Maslow attributed the term "self-actualization" to Goldstein in his original 1943 paper.

=== Concept ===
'Kurt Goldstein first introduced the concept of the organism as a whole,' which is built on the assumption that "every individual, every plant, every animal has only one inborn goal – to actualize itself as it is."

Kurt Goldstein's book, The Organism: A Holistic Approach to Biology Derived from Pathological Data in Man (1939), presented self-actualization as "the tendency to actualize, as much as possible, [the organism's] individual capacities" in the world.

The tendency toward self-actualization is "the only drive by which the life of an organism is determined." However, for Goldstein self-actualization cannot be understood as a kind of goal to be reached sometime in the future. At any moment, the organism has the fundamental tendency to actualize all its capacities and its whole potential, as it is present in that exact moment, under the given circumstances.

=== Discussion ===
Goldstein's work was in the context of Classical Adlerian psychotherapy, which also promotes this level of psychological development by utilizing the foundation of a 12-stage therapeutic model to realistically satisfy the basic needs. This then leads to an advanced stage of "meta-therapy", creative living, and self/other/task-actualization. Goldstein's work is also seen in the context of Gestalt therapy.

The German term used by Goldstein, translated as "self-actualization", is "Selbstverwirklichung." "Self-realization" may be a more adequate translation than the "self-actualization" used in the translation of "The Organism".

Goldstein sets this notion of self-actualization in contrast to "self-preservation" (Selbsterhaltung). "Self-actualization" for Goldstein means something that comes close to realization of one's "essence", one's identity, one's felt sense of oneself; which may in consequence mean that a person is willing to risk their life in order to maintain "self-actualization" (Selbsverwirklichung), the realization of their "essence" of the person he or she feels that she/he IS.

== Carl Rogers' concept ==
Carl Rogers used the term "self-actualization" to describe something distinct from the concept developed by Maslow: the actualization of the individual's sense of 'self.' In Rogers' theory of person-centered therapy, self-actualization is the ongoing process of maintaining and enhancing the individual's self-concept through reflection, reinterpretation of experience, allowing the individual to recover, develop, change, and grow. Self-actualization is a subset of the overall organismic actualizing tendency, and begins with the infant learning to differentiate what is "self" and what is "other" within its "total perceptual field," as their full self-awareness gradually crystallizes. Interactions with significant others are key to the process of self-actualization:

As a result of interaction with the environment, and particularly as a result of evaluational interaction with others, the structure of the self is formed – an organized, fluid but consistent conceptual pattern of perceptions of characteristics and relationships of the 'I' or the 'me', together with the values attached to these concepts.

The process of self-actualization is continuous as the individual matures into a socially competent, interdependent autonomy, and is ongoing throughout the life-cycle. When there is sufficient tension between the individual's sense of self and their experience, a psychopathological state of incongruence can arise, according to Rogers, "individuals are culturally conditioned, rewarded, reinforced, for behaviors which are in fact perversions of the natural directions of the unitary actualizing tendency." In Rogers' theory self-actualization is not the end-point; it is the process that can, in conducive circumstances (in particular the presence of positive self-regard and the empathic understanding of others), lead to the individual becoming more "fully-functioning".

== In the New Age ==
In New Age philosophy and spirituality, self-actualization encompasses both spiritual growth and healing and physical and environmental or planetary healing, often aided by the spiritual. New Age methods of self-actualization include the therapeutic use of quartz crystals and gems; channeling of spiritual or extraterrestrial entities; modern forms of divination; psychological self-help techniques; an interest in ancient or extraterrestrial civilizations; the use of often simplified Native American rituals; environmental and climate activism and awareness; and many techniques and philosophies for healing emotions, relationships, the mind, and the physical and spiritual or subtle body.

== Real-world applications ==
The self-actualization model has been extended into contemporary areas of psychological practice.

=== Self-actualisation in workplace settings ===
The self-actualisation model highlights the multiple needs that employees bring to their jobs, which is why it is widely promoted in workplace settings. It focuses on the higher level needs, such as opportunity, meaningful work, personal growth, required to realise employees' potential. Despite the limited empirical evidence for the strict structure of hierarchy of needs, there is consistent support that high level needs are necessary for workplace motivation. The current corporate conditions, like job insecurity, shifts employees’ focus to basic needs like safety, while supportive policies help mitigate these concerns and encourage motivation.

== Criticism ==
Maslow early noted his impression that "impulsivity, the unrestrained expression of any whim, the direct seeking for 'kicks' and for non-social and purely private pleasures ... is often mislabelled self-actualization." In this sense, "self-actualization" is little more than what Eric Berne described as the game of "'Self-Expression' ... based on the dogma 'Feelings are Good'".

Broader criticism from within humanistic psychology of the concept of self-actualization includes the danger that 'emphasis on the actualizing tendency ... can lead to a highly positive view of the human being but one which is strangely non-relational.' According to Fritz Perls there is also the risk of confusing "self-actualizing and self-image actualizing ... the curse of the ideal." For Perls, by conflating "the virtue of self-actualization and the reality of self-actualization," the latter becomes merely another measuring rod for the "topdog" – the nagging conscience: "You tell me to do things. You tell me to be – real. You tell me to be self-actualized ... I don't have to be that good!" Barry Stevens remarked:

Maslow was unhappy with what happened with many people when they read what he wrote about 'self-actualizing people'. What they did with it was very strange. I have received a fair number of letters saying 'I am a self-actualized person'. Maslow said that he must have left something out. Fritz (Perls) put it in. He saw that most people actualized a self-concept. This is not self-actualizing.

According to Paul Vitz, this may be connected with the charge that "Rogers and Maslow both transform self-actualization from a descriptive notion into a moral norm." However, if it is indeed as good a reality as they purport, then a certain eagerness in their communication is understandable.

In general, during the early twenty-first-century, "the usefulness of the concepts of self and self-actualization continue to attract discussion and debate." The concept has also been criticized in recent years for its Western-centrism, as it is not indicative of the values of many cultures that do not value individualism as highly.

== Cross-cultural perspectives ==
Research in cross cultural psychology documents differences between how cultures define the self. Western models of the self focus on autonomy, self-achievement and self-expression. Whereas, in collectivistic cultures well-being is associated with social harmony, interdependence and fulfilment of social roles.

A study examining Maslow’s characteristics of self-actualization compared British (individualistic) and Indian (collectivistic) participants using the Personal Orientation Inventory (POI). British participants scored significantly higher on POI scales measuring Maslow’s self-actualisation characteristics. According to this study, while the general idea of fulfilling one’s potential may be universal, the specific characteristics described by Maslow reflect Western individualistic values and do not generalise to collectivistic cultural contexts.

== See also ==
- Autodidacticism
- Enlightenment
- Humanism
- Ikigai
- Individuation
- Jonah complex
- Outline of self
- Perfectionism (philosophy)
- Positive disintegration
- Self
- Self-awareness
- Self-esteem
- Self-fulfillment
- Self-handicapping
- Self-help
- Self-knowledge (psychology)
- Self-realization
- Self-reflection
