= Self-realization =

Fulfillment of one's character or personality

Self-realization is a term used in Western philosophy, psychology, and spirituality; and in Indian religions. In the Western understanding, it is the "fulfillment by oneself of the possibilities of one's character or personality" (see also self-actualization). In Hinduism, self-realization is liberating knowledge of the true self, either as the permanent undying Purusha or witness-consciousness, which is atman (essence). In Buddhism, it is knowledge of the absence (sunyata) of such a permanent self.

== Western understanding ==
Merriam Webster's dictionary defines self-realization as:

Fulfillment by oneself of the possibilities of one's character or personality.

In the Western world, "self-realization" has gained great popularity. Influential in this popularity were psycho-analysis, humanistic psychology, the growing acquaintance with Eastern religions, and the growing popularity of Western esotericism. In general, it implies that an individual must possess self-awareness and introspective capacity to attain this philosophy.

=== Psychoanalysis ===
Though Sigmund Freud was skeptical of religion and esotericism, his theories have had a lasting influence on Western thought and self-understanding. His notion of repressed memories, though based on assumptions that some later thinkers have questioned, has become part of mainstream thought. Freud's ideas were further developed by his students and neo-psychoanalysts. Carl Jung, Erik Erikson, Karen Horney and Donald Winnicott have been especially important in the Western understanding of the self, though alternative theories have also been developed by others. Jung developed the notion of individuation, the lifelong process in which the center of psychological life shifts from the ego to the self. Erikson described human development throughout one's lifespan in his theory of psychosocial development. Winnicott developed the notion of the true self, while Horney had two views of our self: the "real self" and the "ideal self". Gerda Boyesen, the founder of biodynamic psychology, developed her salutogenic view on the primary personality and the secondary personality. Roberto Assagioli developed his approach of psychosynthesis, an original approach to psychology. Assagioli's original approach is one that is dynamic and continuous, rather than one that can be reached at a "final destination" or completed.

== Self-Realization Fellowship ==
Self-Realization Fellowship (SRF), founded by Paramahansa Yogananda in Los Angeles, California, teaches its spiritual students to attain self-realization through methods of concentration and meditation, including a technique called kriya yoga. Yogananda described self-realization as the realization of one's true Self or soul – an individualized expression of the universal spirit.

== Indian religious perspectives ==
=== Hinduism ===
In Hinduism, self-realization (atma-jnana or atmabodha) is knowledge of witness-consciousness, the true self which is separate from delusion and identification with mental and material phenomena.

==== Shaivism ====
In Shaivism, self-realization is the direct knowing of the Self God Parashiva. Self-realization (nirvikalpa samadhi, which means "ecstasy without form or seed," or asamprajñata samādhi) is considered the ultimate spiritual attainment.

Self-realization is considered the gateway to moksha, liberation/freedom from rebirth. This state is attained when the Kundalini force pierces through the Sahasrara chakra at the crown of the head. The realization of Self, Parashiva, considered to be each soul's destiny, is attainable through renunciation, sustained meditation and preventing the germination of future karma (the phrase "frying the seeds of karma" is often used)

==== Advaita Vedanta ====
Ātman is the first principle in Advaita Vedanta, along with its concept of Brahman, with Atman being the perceptible personal particular and Brahman the inferred unlimited universal, both synonymous and interchangeable. The soteriological goal, in Advaita, is to gain self-knowledge and complete understanding of the identity of Atman and Brahman. Correct knowledge of Atman and Brahman leads dissolution of all dualistic tendencies and to liberation. Moksha is attained by realizing one's true identity as Ātman, and the identity of Atman and Brahman, the complete understanding of one's real nature as Brahman in this life. This is stated by Shankara as follows:

I am other than name, form and action.
My nature is ever free!
I am Self, the supreme unconditioned Brahman.
I am pure Awareness, always non-dual.

— Adi Shankara, Upadesasahasri 11.7,

=== Buddhism ===
Since Buddhism denies the existence of a separate self, as explicated in the teachings of anatman and sunyata, self-realization is a contradictio in terminis for Buddhism. Though the tathagatagarbha-teachings seem to teach the existence of a separate self, they point to the inherent possibility of attaining awakening, not to the existence of a separate self. The dharmadhatu-teachings make this even more clear: reality is an undivided whole; awakening is the realization of this whole.

=== Sikhism ===
Sikhism propounds the philosophy of Self-realization. This is possible by "aatam-cheennea" or "Aap Pashaanae", purifying the self from the false ego:

'Atam-cheene' is self-analysis, which is gained by peeping into one's self in the light of the teachings of Sri Guru Granth Sahib. It is the process of evaluating and analyzing oneself on the touchstone of 'naam simran' which if practised, pierces into the self and washes it from within. The filth of too much of materialism goes, the self gets purified and the mind comes in 'charhdi kala/higher state of mind". This means that the self should be assessed, examined and purified, leading to self-realization and the purification of our mind. Once purified the mind helps in ushering in oneness with the Super Power as the Guru says, "Atam-cheen bhae nirankari" (SGGS:P. 415) which means that one gets attuned to the Formless Lord through self-realization. Indirectly it means that self-realization leads to God-realization.

Guru Nanak says,

Those who realize their self get immersed in the Lord Himself.

He who realizes his self, comes to know the essence.

== See also ==
- Atma bodha
- Dark Night of the Soul
- Henosis
- New religious movement
- Nondualism
- Self-discovery
- Self-fulfillment
- Self-realization in Jungian psychology
- Simran
- Theoria
- Vision quest
