= Actualizing tendency =

Fundamental element of person-centered therapy

The actualizing tendency is a fundamental element of Carl Rogers' theory of person-centered therapy (PCT) (also known as client-centered therapy). Rogers' theory is predicated on an individual's innate capacity to decide his/her own best directions in life, provided his/her circumstances are conducive to this, based on the organism's "universal need to drive or self-maintain, flourish, self-enhance and self-protect". Counsellors Keith Tudor and Mike Worrall proposed that analogues of the actualizing tendency can be found in texts by various writers from antiquity onward, such as Aristotle, Lucretius, Spinoza, Sándor Ferenczi, Jessie Taft, and Eric Berne.

== Development of the concept ==
Rogers based his notion of the actualizing tendency on his deductive observation that whenever a person is free to choose their goals they select "positive and constructive pathways". Rogers found that: "it is our experience in therapy which has brought us to the point of giving this proposition a central place", and eventually named this theoretical construct the actualizing tendency. The individual: "has one basic tendency and striving – to actualize, maintain and enhance the experiencing organism". In 1980 he elucidated further: "...life is an active process, not a passive one. Whether the stimulus arises from within or without, whether the environment is favourable or unfavourable, the behaviours of an organisms can be counted on to be in the direction of maintaining, enhancing, and reproducing itself. This is the very nature of the process we call life." Fundamentally, therefore, actualization is not something that an organism does, or has, but what it is.

In his "theory of personality and behaviour", published in 1951, Rogers presented 19 propositions, the fourth of which holds that: "The organism has one basic tendency and striving – to actualize, maintain, and enhance the experiencing organism". Rogers regarded the actualizing tendency as the fundamental motivational driver of all human development, emotion and behaviour: "Rather than many needs and motives, it seems entirely possible that organic and psychological needs may be described as partial aspects of this one fundamental need." To illustrate the universal nature of the actualization of an individual organism's life cycle Rogers wrote of how potatoes had sprouted and grown in his parents' dark basement: "They would never become plants, never mature, never fulfil their real potential. But under the most adverse circumstances, they were striving to become. Life would not give up, even if it could not flourish." Nathaniel Raskin, a long-term collaborator with Carl Rogers, wrote in 2000 that the actualizing tendency

...is a central tenet in the writings of Kurt Goldstein, Hobart Mowrer, Harry Stack Sullivan, Karen Horney, and Andras Angyal, to name just a few. The child's painful struggle to learn to walk is an example. It is Rogers' belief, and the belief of most other personality theorists that, given a free choice and in the absence of external force, individuals prefer to be healthy rather than sick, to be independent rather than dependent, and in general to further the optimal development of the total organism.

Actualization of the self (self-actualization) occurs alongside the actualization of all other life functions and organs. There is a difference between self-actualization as conceptualised by Carl Rogers and the more widely known self-actualization of Abraham Maslow.

== Application to psychotherapy ==
Actualization is never the goal for therapy, but the actualizing tendency – the client's "native wisdom" is the "engine that makes psychotherapy work", allowing clients to become more "fully functioning". Self-actualization in person-centred personality theory is the ongoing, adaptive process of "maintaining and enhancing that portion of the phenomenal field [i.e. experiencing] which is the 'self'". This self is continually adapting and modifying itself in response to experience in response to external and internal stimuli. Often misinterpreted as naïvely implying an innate goodness in humans, or alternatively as encouraging an autonomy based on selfish, narcissistic individuality, Rogers' self-actualization is biological, value-neutral and promotes the self-regulated interdependence of a valued member of society, rather than a purely selfish attitude. "Suppose we turn to the animal world and ask ourselves what is the basic nature of the lion, or the sheep, or the dog, or the mouse. To say that any one or all of these are basically hostile or antisocial or carnal seems to be ridiculous."

Rogers built his theory around the idea that this adaptive homeostasis is exactly the process that can either optimise or pathologize the process of self-actualisation: "In nature the actualizing tendency shows surprising efficiency. The organism makes errors, to be sure, but these are corrected on the basis of feedback." While the organism might make errors, much depends on the individual's environment during development: "Those who were fortunate enough to have a loving and supportive environment during their early years would receive the necessary reinforcement to guarantee the nourishment of the actualizing tendency. They would ... be affirmed in their ability to trust their own thoughts and feelings and to make decisions in accordance with their own perceptions and desires" in accordance with their personal organismic valuing process (OVP). In PCT the process of self-actualization is what does the healing, and the therapist must remain non-directive and "sustain the conviction that each person is attempting to actualize himself: do not try to change anyone". Art Bohart (2013) cited evidence for the idea that people can be surprisingly "self-righting" following psychological distress, including trauma, and that it is this capacity that facilitates effective therapy.

To better allow clients to actualize themselves, Rogers taught therapists to implement three core conditions of PCT: therapist congruence, unconditional positive regard, and empathy. Therapist Jeffrey von Glahn hypothesized that these core conditions provide sufficient support for "unforced activation of the client's emotional experiencing".

=== Characteristics of the actualizing tendency ===
Brodley (1999) has identified a number of major characteristics of the actualizing tendency in human beings:

==== It is individual and universal ====
As a fundamental biological process, actualization is both as individual and as universal as the genome of any individual organism. All living things utilise energy, maintain homeostasis (sometimes in very complex, adaptive, or opportunistic ways), grow, respond to stimuli, adapt, and reproduce. Each of these functions is compelled and constrained in a distinctive manner by the individual's unique mix of genes and environmental factors. Actualization arises from the tension at the interface of gene and environment.

==== It is holistic ====
The actualizing tendency applies to all aspects of the organism such that effort towards its development and behaviours are holistically coordinated.

==== It is ubiquitous and constant ====
The actualizing tendency applies to all of the organism's systems, and at all times during its life-cycle.

==== It is directional ====
There are two aspects to the actualizing tendency's directionality: a drive towards the maintenance of organization and a drive towards realization of potential throughout the life cycle.

==== It is primarily tension-increasing ====
An organism's behaviour is governed by feedback processes, in which "tension reduction is a secondary, corrective reaction" (Brodley, 1999): the organismic valuing process (OVP) regulates behaviour via motivational anxieties and associated "pleasurable tensions".

==== It tends towards greater autonomy ====
A maturing organism is increasingly driven towards autonomous behaviours. In humans this involves increased self-regulation and self-determination, and towards a socially negotiated degree of interdependence that the individual is comfortable with. This implies issues related to power: the capacity to assist, resist, or compel, others.

==== It involves self-actualization (in humans) ====
As a subset of the overall organism, the sense of self is always in a state of actualization. A well-functioning human mind is free to continually reflect upon and reinterpret its experience, and to restructure and reinvent itself, allows the individual to adapt in sophisticated ways to complex aspects of its current and predicted environment.

==== It is pro-sociality ====
Brodley (1999) identifies characteristics of sociability that she considers likely to be universal: "the capacity for identification leading to feelings of sympathy for other persons, capacity for empathy, affiliative tendencies, tendencies toward attachment, communication, social cooperation and collaboration, capacities for forming moral or ethical rules, and tendencies to engage in struggles to live according to moral or ethical rules" (Brodley, 1999). Rogers had noted the importance of others in an individual's actualization, which: "...inevitably involves the enhancement of other selves as well... the self-actualization of the organism appears to be in the direction of socialization, broadly defined" (Rogers, 1951).

==== It is channelled through the reflective consciousness ====
Humans have a far more developed consciousness / self-awareness than other animals, and in a well-functioning individual there will be conscious awareness of their organismic needs and motivations. The actualizing tendency, however, is only partially available to the individual's phenomenal field, and is not always fully subject to conscious reflection and effective symbolisation (the process by which an individual makes meaning from their experience).

== Criticism ==
Psychologist Les Greenberg said: "I disagree with Rogers and client-centered theory with regard to the inborn nature of the actualizing tendency and what it is in therapy that releases the growth tendency." Greenberg and Richard van Balen explained that instead of the idea of the actualizing tendency, they preferred the idea of a "development tendency oriented toward increased complexity via exploration, and differentiation and integration of functioning, that results in greater adaptive flexibility".

The general aim of therapy, in Greenberg and van Balen's view, is to help clients to become "viable in a given environment rather than to actualize potential or become all one can be", and such development "is based more on a set of values than on a biological tendency". Greenberg and van Balen noted that basic organismic experience itself, far from being an expression of an actualizing tendency, sometimes needs therapeutic change: "For example, in posttraumatic stress syndrome the emotion system often signals an alarm when no danger is present. Similarly abuse or poor attachment histories can lead to maladaptive experience of, or mistrust of, interpersonal closeness, or a desire for relational experiences that are not in one's best interest." Greenberg and van Balen wrote: "People in our view are often struggling and confused. Both 'good' and 'bad' inclinations do exist as possibilities. Therapy is the co-constructive dialogue in which both the therapist and client struggle to discern and confirm the client's health-promoting tendencies and possibilities", and is not simply a result of an innate actualizing tendency.

== See also ==
- Humanistic psychology
- Organismic theory
