= Heinz Werner's orthogenetic principle =

Heinz Werner's orthogenetic principle is a foundation for current theories of developmental psychology and developmental psychopathology. Initially proposed in 1940, and formulated in 1957, the principle states that "wherever development occurs it proceeds from a state of relative globality and lack of differentiation to a state of increasing differentiation, articulation, and hierarchic integration." In simpler terms, Werner postulates that development always involves individuals becoming more individually distinct (differentiation). This differentiation that is similar to, and can be further understood with the example of differentiation of cells resulting in cell specialisation discussed in several biological academic disciplines. It is an example of an organismic theory based on the intrinsic activity of living systems and is parallel to Piaget's genetic epistemology both emphasizing a holistic view of development. The orthogenetic principle also has many roots in Comparative psychology; Werner suggests that this principle is as applicable to non-human animals as it is to members of the Homo sapiens species.

In contrast to stage theories of development such as Sigmund Freud's description of psychosexual development and Lawrence Kohlberg's theory of moral development, Werner's principle provides a direction for development that can be applied to any behavioural domain. He asserted that the principle provided a single framework for understanding change in child psychology, psychopathology, ethnopsychology, and individual differences. He believed that although the content of these areas may be different, there was a formal similarity of the sequences within each domain moving from the global to the hierarchically integrated. Werner's orthogenetic principle sets defined broad parameters in which development consistently occurs, implying that any theory that attempts to more specifically describe development, for example, through positing distinct non-overlapping stages or more fluid, continuous levels, must be consistent with it.

== Differentiation, articulation and hierarchic integration ==
Differentiation, articulation and hierarchic integration are identified as the aspects by which developmental growth is judged and seen.

=== Differentiation ===
Differentiation is the process by which a global, undifferentiated whole becomes divided into more distinct parts. Werner demonstrates this using the example of "subject and object". Firstly, he states that "a state involving a relative lack of differentiation between subject and object is developmentally prior to one in which there is a polarity of subject and object", articulating a directionality involved in development which involves increasing differentiation. Individual distinctness between a subject and an object indicates a development stage being reached which occurs after a stage in which the subject and object are undifferentiated.

Werner adds that differentiation between subject and object gives rise to an individual's increased control over their actions; rather than merely reacting to the world around them, an individual can "manipulate the environment". Differentiation weakens the influence that a particular environmental circumstance has on behaviour. Therefore, a more developed individual is able to more accurately evaluate others, ultimately increasing one's "appreciation for the needs of others".

The example of concept formation is also used to further explain differentiation. Werner argues that a formation of concepts that involves a concept being differentiated from contextual factors is more developed than one which relates both concept and context. This is the difference between describing a colour as "gall-like" and having a separate name for this specific greeny-blue colour.

=== Articulation ===
While differentiation refers to the division of a whole into distinct parts, articulation concerns the precision and clarity with which these distinct parts are defined. In the context of perception, Werner gives three stages. The first, global stage involves the perception of others (objects, organisms) as a whole, without looking at the distinct parts. The next stage, analytic, is characterised by directing perception at differentiated parts. Finally, the synthetic stage sees the integration of distinct parts within the context of the whole.

Articulation is the process by which differentiated parts become increasingly precise and clearly defined.

=== Hierarchic integration ===
Hierarchic integration is of utmost importance to this principle as it describes the way in which more differentiated and less differentiated components of behaviour interact. Once parts go through differentiation and articulation, rather than staying separate, they are integrated into a hierarchical structure of higher and lower level operations. The behaviours which are more differentiated are higher up in this hierarchy, more readily available to individuals and therefore dominate actions carried out.

Rather than elimination of more primordial components, a reorganisation takes place. The more undifferentiated components are simply placed in a lower position in the hierarchy as lower level operations, therefore, they can still be accessed. For example, Werner describes psychological regression as involving "de-differentiation" and "the activation of primitive levels of behaviour from which undifferentiated... phenomena emerge". De-differentiation is the return of a differentiated behaviour to its primordial state whilst the "activation of primitive levels of behaviour" refers to existing lower level operations being accessed and more undifferentiated behaviours being exhibited. This can occur because those behaviours have merely been suppressed, not eliminated.

== Criticisms ==
Werner proposes that differentiation leads to an individual's increasing ability to make decisions that are less influenced by their environment, which, in turn, results in an individual being more able to interpret the behaviours of others and acknowledge their needs. However, Werner does not explicitly explain the mechanism underlying this increased care. The argument that the acknowledgement of the needs of others comes from individuals' increasing ability to interpret behaviour arguably comes without warrant - it's a bit of a logical leap, and the reader is left wondering how this occurs. Is it a result of an intrinsic acknowledgement of one's own differentiation and distinctness from others that somehow leads to acknowledging that others may have different needs? Or is it the innate quality of individuals to interpret behaviour in a way which makes others' actions justifiable, leading to an acknowledgement of their needs? Werner does not make this clear, thus jeopardising the explanatory completeness of this component.

Werner's example of concept formation can also be subject to scrutiny. The orthogenetic principle proposes that concept formation which combines both context and concept (undifferentiated) is developmentally prior to one which separates the two. It would be reasonable for this to bring the influence of language on development into question here. Does this mean that language has the power to stunt development? For example, in some higher-context cultures such as the Japanese, context plays a great role in effective communication, prompting the question: Are individuals in these cultures less advanced than those in lower-context (typically Western) cultures?

Additionally, is it necessary for concepts to be independent of the context in which they occur? If so, why when context and behaviour are intricately related? Werner proposes that context-independent thought is of a higher development status than concept formation which relies on context, however, one could argue that these methods of concept formation are simply different, rather than more or less advanced. The importance of context-independent concepts is assumed, rather than clearly demonstrated, which, in turn, also risks cultural bias.
