= Psychosynthesis =

Psychological approach

Psychosynthesis is a framework and approach to psychology developed by Italian psychiatrist Roberto Assagioli. It is "one of the prime forces in transpersonal psychology." It "stretches beyond the boundaries of personal psychology and individuality by postulating a deeper center of identity: the self, our essential Being. The self includes, but transcends, our personal day-to-day consciousness, leading to an enhanced sense of life direction and purpose." Along with the idea of a spiritual or transpersonal self, Psychosynthesis emphasizes "the value placed upon exploration of creative potential, and the hypothesis that each individual has a purpose in life".

Psychosynthesis considers the self an "ontological reality," a being, often referred to as the "higher self." It is a stable center or core of life. By contrast, the personal self, the self-conscious “I” that is our everyday sense of identity, is actually a reflection of the self in the normal person. Psychosynthesis sees each individual as unique in terms of purpose in life, and places value on the exploration of human potential, combining spiritual development with psychological healing and including the life journey of an individual or their unique path to self-realization. Psychosynthesis is actively used in the efforts of individuals toward personal self-actualization and transpersonal self-realization, but is also used by professionals around the world in the contexts of life coaching and psychotherapy. It has also been used in other contexts, including medicine, education, environmental design, community and organizations.

The integrative framework of psychosynthesis began with Sigmund Freud's theory of the unconscious, which it expands and modifies as a method of investigation, while rejecting the specific theories of sexuality, etc. held by Freud. Psychosynthesis also has some similarities with existential psychology, analytical psychology and humanistic psychology. Among other uses, psychosynthesis can be used to address psychological distress and intra-psychic and interpersonal conflicts. Psychosynthesis has a strong presence in the fields of coaching and especially psychotherapy, some of which can be referenced in the external links and training centers listed at the bottom of this page. For Assagioli, synthesis is “a trend that is the expression of a universal principle” whose manifestation can be found in all aspects of reality: from the world of inorganic matter to the organic vegetable and animals worlds, from the psychic world of emotions and ideas to the world of interpersonal and social relationships, to the spiritual worlds.

== Development ==
Psychosynthesis was developed by Italian psychiatrist Roberto Assagioli, who was a colleague of Freud, Jung and Bleuler. He began to formulate his ideas as early as 1910, but did not collect his thinking into a whole until the presentation of his pamphlet A New Method of Healing: Psychosynthesis, which was published in 1927. He later compared psychosynthesis to the prevailing thinking of the day, contrasting psychosynthesis with existential psychology, but unlike the latter he considered loneliness not to be "either ultimate or essential". Assagioli asserted that "the direct experience of the self, of pure self-awareness — independent of any 'content' of the field of consciousness and of any situation in which the individual may find himself — is a true, 'phenomenal' experience, an inner reality which can be empirically verified." Spiritual goals of "self-realization" and the "interindividual psychosynthesis"—of "social integration...the harmonious integration of the individual into ever larger groups up to the 'one humanity'"—were central to Assagioli's theory.

Psychosynthesis departed from the empirical foundations of behavioral psychology because it studied a person as a personality and a soul, even though Assagioli continued to insist that it was scientific. He asserted that it is a mistake to consider fields of research “scientific” or not; rather it is the method of research that is scientific or not. He asserted that the scientific method means clear thinking and sound reasoning on well-established facts, which are not limited to what can be weighed or measured. He asserted that “It is undeniable that all subjectively lived psychological phenomena are facts, even if not susceptible to direct weighing and measuring procedures, and as such can be studied scientifically. The pragmatic principle must be accepted that everything has its reality which produces an effect that modifies a preexistent state." Scientific studies of internal states are often done by gathering testimony about inner experiences. This is an accepted approach to study of altered states of consciousness. Assagioli developed therapeutic methods beyond those in psychoanalysis. Although the unconscious is an important part of his theory, he was careful to maintain a balance with rational, conscious therapeutic work. Psychosynthesis was not intended to be a school of thought or an exclusive method.“It could be defined principally as a general attitude, a tendency toward, and a series of activities aiming at, integration and synthesis in every field.” However, many conferences and publications had it as a central theme, and psychosynthesis training centers were formed in Italy, the UK and the United States in the 1960s and are now found in many countries in Europe, North and South America, Asia, New Zealand and Australia. Today, psychosynthesis is recognized through its membership in the European Association of Psychotherapy.

Assagioli was not the first to use the term "psychosynthesis". The earliest use was by James Jackson Putnam, who used it as the name of his electroconvulsive therapy. The term was also used by C. G. Jung and A. R. Orage, who were both more aligned with Assagioli's use of the term than Putnam's use. C. G. Jung, in comparing his goals to those of Sigmund Freud, wrote, "If there is a 'psychoanalysis' there must also be a 'psychosynthesis which creates future events according to the same laws'." A. R. Orage, who was the publisher of the influential journal, The New Age, used the term as well, but hyphenated it (psycho-synthesis). Orage formed an early psychology study group (which included Maurice Nicoll who later studied with Carl Jung) and concluded that what humanity needed was not psychoanalysis, but psycho-synthesis. The term was also used by Bezzoli. Freud, however, was opposed to what he saw as the directive element in Jung's approach to psychosynthesis, and Freud argued for a spontaneous synthesis on the patient's part: "[During psychoanalysis] the great unity which we call his ego fits into itself all the instinctual impulses which before had been split off and held apart from it. The psycho-synthesis is thus achieved in analytic treatment without our intervention, automatically and inevitably."

== Origins ==
In 1909, C.G. Jung wrote to Sigmund Freud of "a very pleasant and perhaps valuable acquaintance, our first Italian, a Dr. Assagioli from the psychiatric clinic in Florence". Later however, this same Roberto Assagioli (1888 – 1974) wrote a doctoral dissertation, "La Psicoanalisi," in which he began to move away from Freud's psychoanalysis toward what he called psychosynthesis:

A beginning of my conception of psychosynthesis was contained in my doctoral thesis on Psychoanalysis (1910), in which I pointed out what I considered to be some of the limitations of Freud's views.

In developing psychosynthesis, Assagioli agreed with Freud that healing childhood trauma and developing a healthy ego were necessary aims of psychotherapy, but Assagioli believed that human growth could not be limited to this alone. A student of philosophical and spiritual traditions of both East and West, Assagioli sought to address human growth as it proceeded beyond the norm of the well-functioning ego; he wished to support the fruition of human potential—what Abraham Maslow later termed self-actualization—into the spiritual or transpersonal dimensions of human experience as well.

Assagioli envisioned an approach to the human being that could address both the process of personal growth—of personality integration and self-actualization—as well as transpersonal development. The transpersonal dimension is glimpsed for example during peak experiences (Maslow) of inspired creativity, spiritual insight, and unitive states of consciousness. Psychosynthesis recognizes the process of self-realization, of contact and response with one's deepest callings and directions in life, which can involve either or both personal and transpersonal development.

Psychosynthesis is therefore one of the earliest forerunners of both humanistic psychology and transpersonal psychology, even preceding Jung's break with Freud by several years. Assagioli's conception has an affinity with existential-humanistic psychology and other approaches that attempt to understand the nature of the healthy personality, personal responsibility, and choice, and the actualization of the personal self. Similarly, his conception is related to the field of transpersonal psychology with its focus on higher states of consciousness, spirituality, and human experience beyond the individual self. Assagioli served on the board of editors for both the Journal of Humanistic Psychology and the Journal of Transpersonal Psychology.

Assagioli presents two major theoretical models in his seminal book, Psychosynthesis, models that have remained fundamental to psychosynthesis theory and practice:

1. A diagram and description using a model of the constitution of the human person
2. A stage theory of the process of psychosynthesis

== Aims ==
In Psychosomatic Medicine and Bio-psychosynthesis, Assagioli states that the principal aims and tasks of psychosynthesis are:

1. the elimination of the conflicts and obstacles, conscious and unconscious, that block [the complete and harmonious development of the human personality]
2. the use of active techniques to stimulate the psychic functions still weak and immature.

In his book, Psychosynthesis: A Collection of Basic Writings (1965), Assagioli writes of three aims of psychosynthesis:

Let us examine whether and how it is possible to solve this central problem of human life, to heal this fundamental infirmity of man. Let us see how he may free himself from this enslavement and achieve an harmonious inner integration, true self-realization, and right relationships with others. (p. 21)

== Model of the person ==
Psychosynthesis Egg Diagram

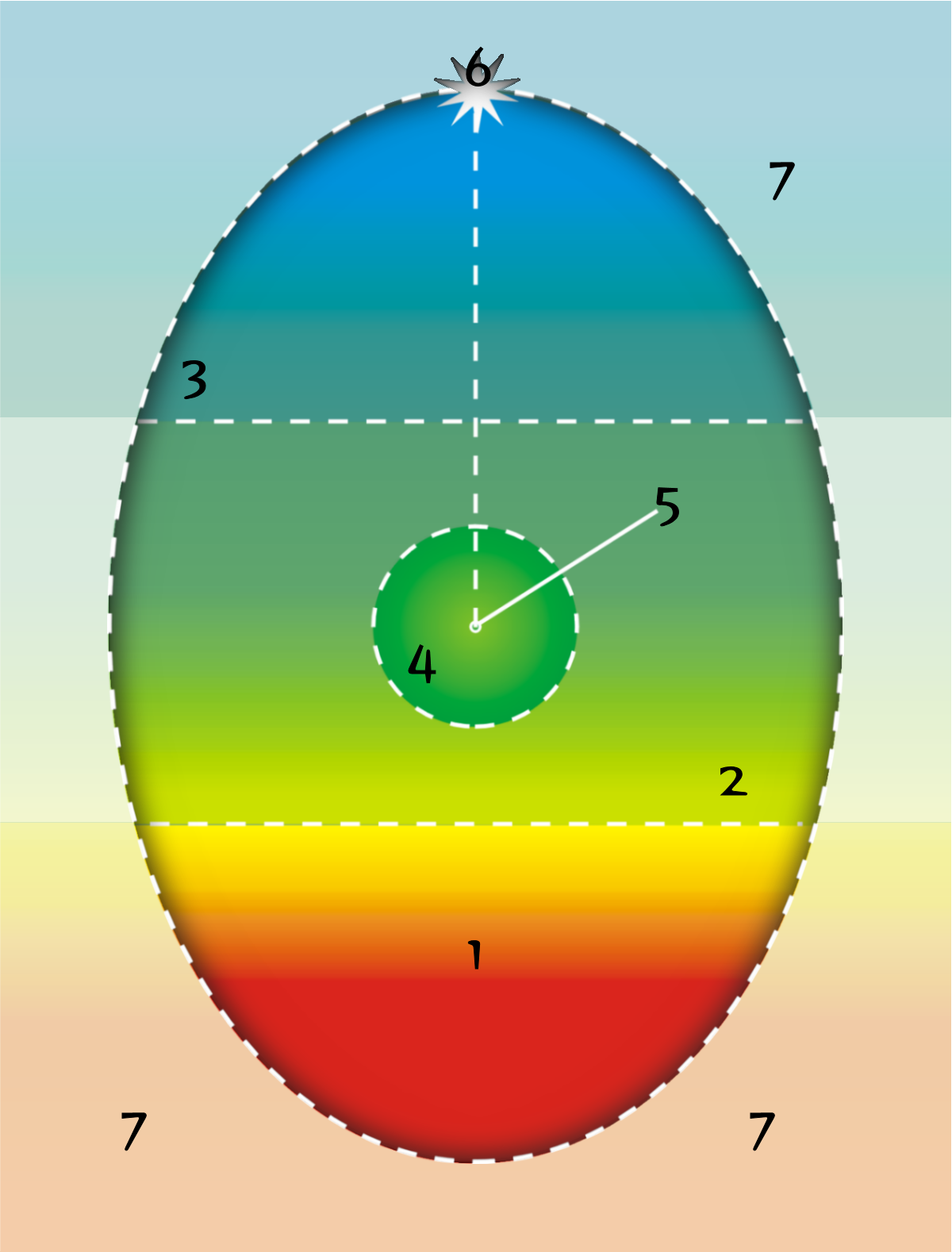

1: The Lower Unconscious
2: The Middle Unconscious
3: The Higher Unconscious or Superconscious
4: The Field of Consciousness
5: The Conscious Self or "I"
6: The Higher Self
7: The Collective Unconscious

The concept of the human psychological constitution in psychosynthesis theory is illustrated in the so-called "Egg Diagram," which maps the human psyche into different distinct and interconnected levels.

=== The Lower Unconscious ===
For Assagioli, the lower unconscious contains the elementary psychological activities which direct the life of the body; the fundamental drives and primitive urges; many emotionally charged complexes; many dreams and imaginings of a “lower kind;” “lower” uncontrolled parapsychological processes; and various pathological manifestations such as phobias, obsessions, compulsive urges and paranoid delusions. By another account, 'the lower unconscious, which contains one's personal psychological past in the form of repressed complexes, long-forgotten memories and dreams and imaginations'.

According to John Firman and Ann Gila, "the lower unconscious is that realm of the person to which is relegated the experiences of shame, fear, pain, despair, and rage associated with primal wounding suffered in life. One way to think of the lower unconscious is that it is a particular bandwidth of one's experiential range that has been broken away from consciousness. It comprises that range of experience related to the threat of personal annihilation, of destruction of self, of nonbeing, and more generally, of the painful side of the human condition. As long as this range of experience remains unconscious, the person will have a limited ability to be empathic with self or others in the more painful aspects of human life." Firman and Gila assert that the lower unconscious is formed when a person separates experiences of empathic failures from consciousness.

Roberto Assagioli’s approach to the lower unconscious is diametrically opposite to this: he regarded it as part of the fundamental constitution of a human being. He did not assert that either the lower and higher unconscious are by definition repressed. Comparing his egg diagram to Maslow’s Hierarchy of Needs, he states: “We can look at the diagram of the psychological constitution of man [egg-diagram]. The basic and normal personal needs concern the lower and middle psychological life, both conscious and unconscious.” Assagioli accepted that parts of the lower unconscious are repressed, but not all of it. There is also no evidence that Assagioli accepted the concepts of “personal annihilation” or “nonbeing” that these writers discuss. These writers share an outlook and use terminology derived from certain existentialist philosophers (Jean-Paul Sartre asserted that nothingness is part of reality, and nothingness is a lack of being). Assagioli explicitly contradicted this position, saying, “In certain periods men can feel internally isolated, but the extreme existentialist position is not true, neither psychologically nor spiritually.”

"The lower unconscious merely represents the most primitive part of ourselves...It is not bad, it is just earlier '. Indeed, 'the "lower" side has many attractions and great vitality'.

=== The Middle Unconscious ===
According to Roberto Assagioli, “the middle unconscious is formed of psychological elements similar to those of our waking consciousness and easily accessible to it. In this inner region our various experiences are assimilated, our ordinary mental and imaginative activities are elaborated and developed in a sort of psychological gestation before their birth into the light of consciousness.”

The middle unconscious is a sector of the person whose contents, although unconscious, nevertheless support normal conscious functioning in an ongoing way (thus it is illustrated as most immediate to "I"). It is the capacity to form patterns of skills, behaviors, feelings, attitudes, and abilities that can function without conscious attention, thereby forming the infrastructure of one's conscious life.

The function of the middle unconscious can be seen in all spheres of human development, from learning to walk and talk, to acquiring languages, to mastering a trade or profession, to developing social roles. Anticipating today's neuroscience, Assagioli even referred to "developing new neuromuscular patterns". All such elaborate syntheses of thought, feeling, and behavior are built upon learnings and abilities that must eventually operate unconsciously.

According to Firman and Gila, 'Human healing and growth that involves work with either the middle or the lower unconscious is known as personal psychosynthesis '.

=== The Higher Unconscious or Superconscious ===
Assagioli referred to The Higher Unconscious or Superconscious as the region from which “we receive our higher intuitions and inspirations—artistic, philosophical or scientific, ethical “imperatives” and urges to humanitarian and heroic action. It is the source of the higher feelings such as altruistic love, of genius and of the states of contemplation, illumination and ecstasy. In this realm are latent the higher psychic functions and spiritual energies.”

The higher unconscious (or superconscious) denotes "our higher potentialities which seek to express themselves, but which we often repel and repress". As with the lower unconscious, this area is often not available to consciousness, so for many people its existence is inferred from moments in which contents from that level affect consciousness.

Psychosynthesis stresses that any distinction between “higher” and “lower” unconscious is developmental, not moralistic. The lower unconscious is simply our past, and forms the ‘foundation’ of our present awareness. Assagioli, however, did stress the evolutionary differences and development of the three sectors in the egg diagram. In the Act of Will he says the following: “The existence of different levels of being having different values is an evident and undeniable manifestation of the great law of evolution, as it progresses from simple and crude stages to more refined and highly organized ones. Applying this to the sphere of love … it is evident that a love that is overpowering, possessive, jealous, and blind is at a lower level than one that is tender and concerned with the person of the loved one, that seeks his well-being and desires the union of the best aspects of both personalities.”

Conscious contact with the higher unconscious can be seen in those moments, termed peak experiences by Maslow, which are often difficult to put into words, experiences in which one senses deeper meaning in life, a profound serenity and peace, a universality within the particulars of existence, or perhaps a unity between oneself and the cosmos. This level of the unconscious represents an area of the personality that contains the "heights" overarching the "depths" of the lower unconscious. As long as this range of experience remains unconscious – in what Desoille termed '"repression of the sublime"' – the person will have a limited ability to be empathic with self or other in the more sublime aspects of human life.

The higher unconscious thus represents 'an autonomous realm, from where we receive our higher intuitions and inspirations – altruistic love and will, humanitarian action, artistic and scientific inspiration, philosophic and spiritual insight, and the drive towards purpose and meaning in life'.

The higher unconscious in psychosynthesis must not be confused with Freud’s “superego.” Assagioli asserted, “There is one point that needs clarification; and that is that there are different levels of moral consciousness, and it is important to distinguish between them. On the one hand, there is the moral consciousness that Freud referred to by the name “super-ego,” which is largely derived from prohibitions and parental commands. This type of “conscience” is linked to intense emotional charges, such as fear of doing wrong and guilt for every transgression, and consequently is harmful. This type of morality, produced by introjected external influences, is rigid, strict and intransigent. According to Assagioli, “the superconscious constitutes the higher section or aspect of the person of which the ego or self (the point in the middle of the circle) is not normally aware. But at times the conscious self rises or is raised to that higher region where it has specific experiences and states of awareness of various kinds which can be called “spiritual” in the widest sense. At other times it happens that some contents of the superconscious “descend” and penetrate into the area of the normal consciousness of the ego, producing what is called “inspiration.” This interplay has great importance and value, both for fostering creativity and for achieving psychosynthesis.

Concerning the experience of the higher self, Assagioli differentiates between the experience of the contents, processes and activities of the superconscious and the contentless experience of the Higher self. He said that there is a "difference between becoming aware of superconscious levels of experience and contents on the one hand, and pure self-realization on the other. Self-realization, in this specific well-defined sense, means the momentary or more or less temporary identification or blending of the I-consciousness with the spiritual self, in which the former, which is the reflection of the latter, becomes reunited, blended with the spiritual self. In these cases there is a forgetfulness of all contents of consciousness, of all which forms the personality both on normal levels and those of the synthesized personality which include superconscious or spiritual levels of life and experience; there is only the pure intense experience of the self.

=== Subpersonalities ===
William James recognized that various psychological traits are not integrated, but form behavioral roles that he called "the various selves," which shift according to the relationships we have with other people, surroundings, groups, etc. Roberto Assagioli calls these "subpersonalities," and recognized that they are part of everyday normal behavior. You can recognize them by noticing that "you behave differently in your office, at home, in social interplay, in solitude, at church, or as a member of a political party . . . Ordinary people shift from one to the other without clear awareness, and only a thin thread of memory connects them; but for all practical purposes they are different beings – they act differently, they show very different traits."

Subpersonalities form a central strand in psychosynthesis thinking. 'One of the first people to have started really making use of subpersonalities for therapy and personal growth was Roberto Assagioli', psychosynthesis reckoning that 'subpersonalities exist at various levels of organization, complexity, and refinement' throughout the mind. A five-fold process of recognition, acceptance, co-ordination, integration, and synthesis 'leads to the discovery of the transpersonal self, and the realization that that is the final truth of the person, not the subpersonalities'.

Some subpersonalities may be seen 'as psychological contents striving to emulate an archetype...degraded expressions of the archetypes of higher qualities '. Others will resist the process of integration; will 'take the line that it is difficult being alive, and it is far easier – and safer – to stay in an undifferentiated state'. Roberto Assagioli said that [some] subpersonalities are the semi-independent nuclei of a number of differing and conflicting tendencies. Other subpersonalities, or roles, are those played in the different social groups . . . which [a person] may have or may want to play in life. "One should become clearly aware of these subpersonalities because . . . it is possible to synthesize [them] into a larger organic whole without repressing any of the useful traits."

=== The Conscious Self or "I" ===
Psychosynthesis Star Diagram
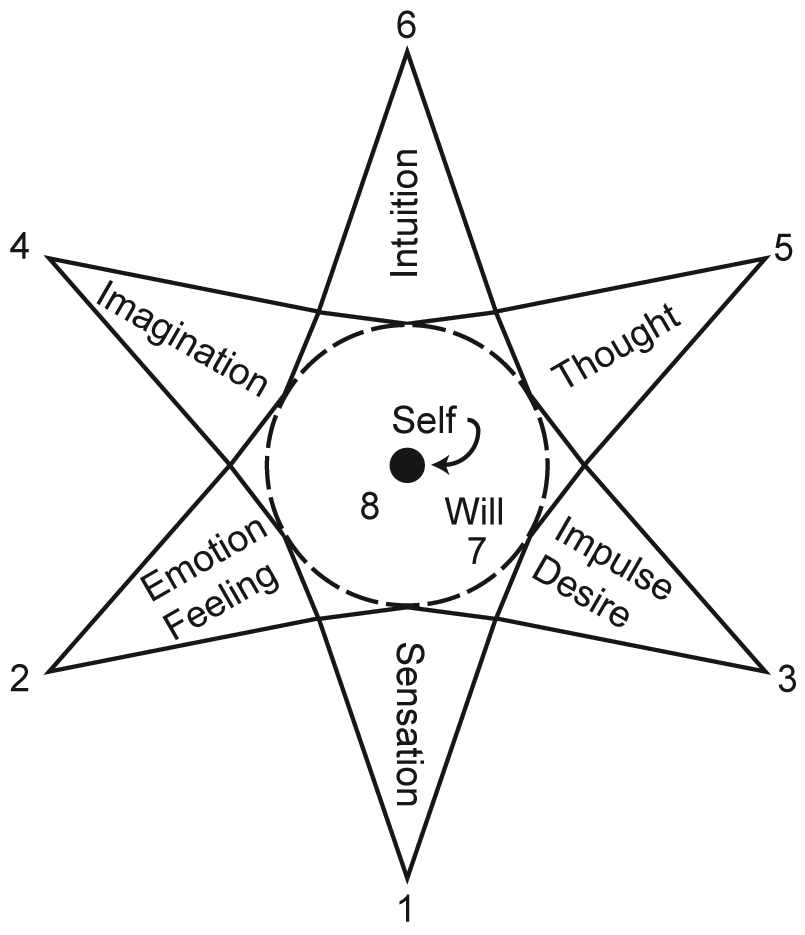
Psychosynthesis Star Diagram
formulated by Roberto Assagioli

The "I" or conscious self is a point or center of pure self-awareness: the direct "reflection" or "projection" of the self, distinct but not separate from the personality and all contents of conscious experience. The "I" is a center of consciousness, or awareness, and will, whose field of consciousness (the part of our personality of which we are directly aware) is represented by the concentric circle around the "I" in the star diagram.

It is well to become aware of the relationships between the self and the will on one hand and the various other psychological functions on the other. The will has been placed at the center of the star diagram in direct contact with the conscious I, or personal self, to show the close connection between them. Through the will, the I acts on the other six psychological functions, regulating and directing them. The diagram is oversimplified, like all diagrams, but it helps to give prominence to the central position of the will. The self is not only a center of awareness. "There is another part of the inner self – the will-er or the directing agent – that actively intervenes to orchestrate the various functions and energies of the personality."

Assagioli describes the experience of the conscious “I” with these words: “the body, feelings, and mind are instruments of experience, perception and action, tools that are changeable and impermanent. But the 'I' is essentially different: it is simple, unchanging, self-conscious. The experience of the 'I' can be formulated as follows: 'I am I, a Center of pure consciousness.' Affirming this with conviction does not mean that one has already achieved the experience of the 'I,' self-identification, but it is the path that leads there and is a means of mastering our psychic activities." … "All this is preparation for the final positive stage, the affirmation and experience of self-consciousness: 'I am convinced and affirm that I am a Center of pure awareness, of pure self-consciousness; I am a Center of will, capable of mastering, directing and using all my psychic functions and my body. I AM. Let us dwell on this statement, striving to realize this pure consciousness of being, this stable, unchanging Center, steady as a rock amidst the churning waves of becoming. 'I AM.'"

Assagioli developed his "exercise of disidentification and self-identification" to help people make the distinction between the "I" and its experiences:

1. The first stage is to sit comfortably, releasing all muscle and nerve tension; this can be helped by a prior practice of the relaxation exercise. It is good to keep the spine straight, the head slightly lowered; close the eyes; then take a few deep, slow, regular breaths. (pause)

2. Affirm slowly, with attention and conviction, “I have a body, but I am not my body. My body may be in different conditions of health or sickness, it may be rested or tired, but this has nothing to do with Me, with my true Self. My body is a valuable instrument of experience and action in the outer world, but it is only a tool; I treat it well, I try to keep it healthy, but it is not my self. I have a body, but I am not my body." (After a period of training one can simply repeat the final sentence several times, “I have a body, but I am not my body.” The same applies to the later stages as well.)(pause)

3. We affirm with conviction, “I have emotions, but I am not my emotions. They are different, changing, conflicting, while I always remain me, myself, in the alternation of hope and discouragement, joy and sorrow, irritation and calm. I can observe, understand and judge my emotions, and become more and more capable of mastering, directing and using them.” — “I have emotions, but I am not my emotions.”(pause)

4. “I have desires, but I am not my desires. Desires are also changeable, conflicting; they are a succession of attractions and repulsions. There are desires in me, but they are not Me." (pause)

5. “I have a mind, but I am not my mind. It may be more or less developed and active; it is undisciplined, but little by little I can master and direct it. It is an organ of knowledge, both of the external world and of the internal world, but it is not myself. I have a mind, but I am not my mind.” (pause)

6. All this is preparation for the final positive stage, the affirmation and experience of self-consciousness: “I am convinced and affirm that I am a Center of pure awareness, of pure self-consciousness; I am a Center of will, capable of mastering, directing and using all my psychic functions and my body. I AM.”

Psychosynthesis suggests that "we can experience the will as having four stages. The first stage could be described as 'having no will'", and might perhaps be linked with the hegemony of the lower unconscious. "The next stage of the will is understanding that 'will exists'. We might still feel that we cannot actually do it, but we know...it is possible". "Once we have developed our will, at least to some degree, we pass to the next stage which is called 'having a will'", and thereafter "in psychosynthesis we call the fourth and final stage of the evolution of the will in the individual 'being will'" – which then "relates to the 'I' or self...[and] draws energy from the transpersonal self".

It is the "I" who is aware of the psyche-soma contents as they pass in and out of awareness; the contents come and go, while "I" may remain present to each experience as it arises. But "I" is dynamic as well as receptive: "I" has the ability to affect awareness, in addition to the contents of awareness, by choosing to focus awareness (as in many types of meditation), expand it, or contract it.

Regarding the conscious self or “I,” Assagioli wrote, The changing contents of our consciousness . . . are one thing, while the “I,” the self, the center of our consciousness is another." "The reflection appears to be self-existent but has, in reality, no autonomous substantiality. It is, in other words, not a new and different light but a projection of its luminous source".

=== The self ===
At the top of the oval diagram, shown as a “star” that is partly within and partly outside of the oval, is the self (which has also been called the higher self or the transpersonal self). Assagioli wrote, “The conscious self is generally not only submerged in the ceaseless flow of psychological contents but seems to disappear altogether when we fall asleep, when we faint, when we are under the effect of an anesthetic or narcotic, or in a state of hypnosis. And when we awake the self mysteriously reappears, we do not know how or whence—a fact which, if closely examined, is truly baffling and disturbing. This leads us to assume that the re-appearance of the conscious self or ego is due to the existence of a permanent center, of a true self situated beyond or “above” it.”

Assagioli understood the higher self as a superconscious entity or being that pervades the personality with its energies through the superconscious: ”The key thought is in the [Bhagavad] Gita: “Having pervaded with one part of myself the whole universe, I remain”. What “remains” is the self on its own level. Yet while it remains there, it can pervade and is pervading the whole universe of the personality, and this it does through the superconscious.” Assagioli also understood the higher self as a transcendent being: “This self is above, and unaffected by, the flow of the mind-stream or by bodily conditions; and the personal conscious self should be considered merely as its reflection, its “projection” in the field of the personality. The transpersonal self is “outside” time and above it. It exists and lives in the dimension of the Eternal.” When it comes to the experience of the higher self, Assagioli differentiates between the experience of the contents, processes, and activities in the superconscious and the contentless experience of the higher self, which must not be confused.

Assagioli describes self-realization (not to be confused with self-actualization) as “the realization of one’s true self — the discovery or creation of a unifying center: the controlling Principle of our life. He presents the self-realization process in three ascending stages. In The Act of Will, Assagioli states:

“In the terminology of psychosynthesis, self-actualisation corresponds to personal psychosynthesis. This includes the development and harmonising of all human functions and potentialities at all levels of the lower and middle area in the diagram of the constitution of man [i.e. egg-diagram]… Self-realisation concerns the third higher level, that of the superconscious, and pertains to Transpersonal or spiritual psychosynthesis.

Self-realisation itself has three different stages. The first is the activation and expression of the potentialities residing in the superconscious: it includes… various types of transcendence… Leonardo da Vinci or Goethe would be good examples of this.

The second stage of self-realisation is the direct awareness of the SELF, which culminates in the unification of the consciousness of the personal self, or “I”, with that of the transpersonal self. Here one might mention those who have done self-sacrificing work for a beneficent cause in any field. Active humanitarians who have given themselves to a cause are good examples: Gandhi, Florence Nightingale, Martin Luther King, Schweitzer. Schweitzer is typical because he gave up even some of his higher interests – music and culture – in order to do humanitarian work. In terms of will, it is the unification of the personal will with the Transpersonal Will.

The third stage of self-realisation is the communion of the transpersonal self with the universal self, and correspondingly of the individual will with the Universal Will. Here we find the highest mystics of all times and places.”

The relationship of the "I" and the Self is paradoxical. Assagioli was clear that "I" and Self were from one point of view, one. He wrote, "There are not really two selves, two independent and separate entities. The Self is one". Such a nondual unity is a fundamental aspect of this level of experience. But Assagioli also understood that there could be an experience of illumination that is initiated by the transpersonal self as well:

Consciousness is able to participate, at least in part, in what takes place in the superconscious, and to receive the gifts that come down from the Spirit, and then contemplation produces illumination. How can one say what illumination is? In human language it is already difficult to express the delicate nuances and tones of normal states of mind, to indicate the different qualities of inner experiences; but how much more difficult is it to give an adequate idea of states of mind that are so much higher or more intense, and qualitatively so different from the usual ones! Accounts of religious experiences often speak of a "call" from God, or a "pull" from some Higher Power; this sometimes starts a "dialogue" between the man [or woman] and this "higher Source"...

In his essay "Contemplation and Illumination," which was originally part of a series of lectures in 1934 at his Institute in Florence, Assagioli discusses such experiences in more detail, quoting R. Maurice Bucke, Charles Finney (former President of Oberlin College) and French philosopher Pascal, and for specific examples refers us to William James' well-known survey Varieties of Religious Experience, first published in 1902. The most well-known example of the experience of illumination initiated from a higher level is the account of the conversion of the apostle Paul, as recounted in The Acts of the Apostles.

However Assagioli made a clear distinction between experience of the Self and experience of God, or The Universal. He said, “those who have these higher human experiences usually mix the experience of the Self with expressions about God, or some superconscious aspect, such as beauty or the simple experience of ecstasy. Or they jump directly to the universal self . . .There is such an intense feeling of oneness that people often do not pay attention to the fact that it is the Self [not the personal self or “I”] that experiences Oneness.” This is a subtle but crucial issue. If one were truly immersed in the universal, one would not know it.

Roberto Assagioli insisted that the actual experience of The Self is often mixed up with other experiences. The conscious experience of the Self is exemplified by such experiences as illumination or mystical union: it is not an ordinary “experience.” Self-consciousness can be experienced through exercises and a gradual, one might say “scientific” procedure. We tend to jump from the personal to the Universal . . . without the experience of illumination of the Self, and also of intermediate degrees, the percentage of self-consciousness at the higher levels and of communion with the Universal.”

== Stages ==
Writing about the model of the person presented above, Assagioli states that it is a "structural, static, almost 'anatomical' representation of our inner constitution, while it leaves out its dynamic aspect, which is the most important and essential one". Thus he follows this model immediately with a stage theory outlining the process of psychosynthesis. These stages relate to his clinical theory: how personal psychosynthesis is accomplished through a counseling process.This scheme can be called the "stages of psychosynthesis", and is presented here.

Although the linear progression of the following stages does make logical sense, these stages may not in fact be experienced in this sequence; they are not a ladder up which one climbs, but aspects of a single process. Further, one never outgrows these stages; any stage can be present at any moment throughout the process of Psychosynthesis. Assaglioli acknowledges 'persisting traits belonging to preceding psychological ages' and the perennial possibility of 'retrogression to primitive stages'.

The stages of Psychosynthesis may be tabulated as follows:

1. Thorough knowledge of one's personality.
2. Control of its various elements.
3. Realization of one's true Self—the discovery or creation of a unifying center.
4. Psychosynthesis: the formation or reconstruction of the personality around a new center.

Assagioli divided his theory of development into two broad phases: “Psychosynthesis utilizes many techniques of psychological action, aiming first at the development and perfection of the personality, and then at its harmonious co-ordination and increasing unification with the Self. These phases may be called respectively “personal” and “spiritual” psychosynthesis.”

In his book The Act of Will he further elaborates on his developmental theory, aligning his view with Maslow’s "Hierarchy of Needs," proposing an ascending stage model where the "I" develops from prepersonal (lower unconscious) to personal (middle unconscious) to transpersonal development (transpersonal unconscious or superconscious) culminating in the unification of the "I" with the higher self and ultimately with the universal self.

“The realization of the higher self “is a process which primarily reaches through the Superconscious, towards the soul [higher Self] and the universal self. A prolonged phase of purification is also a part of this process, so the descent into the abyss of the lower unconscious is also necessary. Our personal energies must be purified so they can express the universal love-wisdom that flows from the Superconscious.”

In his article Spiritual Development and Nervous Diseases, which was first published in 1932 and later revised and included as chapter two in his first book under the title “Self-Realization and Psychological Disturbances,” he gives further information about spiritual development and the stages we undergo, listing five spiritual crises:

1. Crises preceding the spiritual awakening.

2. Crises determined by the spiritual awakening.

3. Reactions to the spiritual awakening.

4. Phases of the process of transmutation.

5. The “Dark Night of the Soul.”

== Methods ==
Psychosynthesis was regarded by Assagioli as more of an orientation and a general approach to the whole human being, and as existing apart from any of its particular concrete applications. This approach allows for a wide variety of techniques and methods to be used within the psychosynthesis context. 'Dialogue, Gestalt techniques, dream work, guided imagery, affirmations, and meditation are all powerful tools for integration', but 'the attitude and presence of the counselor are of far greater importance than the particular methods used'. Sand tray, art therapy, journaling, drama therapy, and body work; cognitive-behavioral techniques; object relations, self psychology, and family systems approaches, may all be used in different contexts, from individual and group psychotherapy, to meditation and self-help groups. Psychosynthesis offers an overall view which can help orient oneself within the vast array of different modalities available today, and be applied either for therapy or for self-actualization.

Recently, two psychosynthesis techniques were shown to help student sojourners in their acculturation process. First, the self-identification exercise eased anxiety, an aspect of culture shock. Secondly, the subpersonality model aided students in their ability to integrate a new social identity. In another recent study, the subpersonality model was shown to be an effective intervention for aiding creative expression, helping people connect to different levels of their unconscious creativity. Most recently, psychosynthesis psychotherapy has proven to activate personal and spiritual growth in self-identified atheists.

One broad classification of the techniques used involves the following headings: 'Analytical: To help identify blocks and enable the exploration of the unconscious'. Psychosynthesis stresses 'the importance of using obstacles as steps to growth' – 'blessing the obstacle...blocks are our helpers'. 'Mastery...the eight psychological functions need to be gradually retrained to produce permanent positive change'. 'Transformation...the refashioning of the personality around a new centre'. 'Grounding...into the concrete terms of daily life.'Relational...to cultivate qualities such as love, openness and empathy'.

== Criticism ==
In the December 1974 issue of Psychology Today, Assagioli was interviewed by Sam Keen and was asked to comment on the limits of psychosynthesis. He answered paradoxically: "The limit of psychosynthesis is that it has no limits. It is too extensive, too comprehensive. Its weakness is that it accepts too much. It sees too many sides at the same time and that is a drawback."

According to one writer, psychosynthesis "has always been on the fringes of the 'official' therapy world" and it "is only recently that the concepts and methods of psychoanalysis and group analysis have been introduced into the training and practice of psychosynthesis psychotherapy". However, Assagioli always advocated using the methods of psychoanalysis while disavowing Freudian doctrines. He insisted from the beginning that “psychosynthesis presupposes psychoanalysis, or rather, includes it as a first and necessary stage.”

Psychosynthesis has been at times exposed to the dangers of cultism, so that on one occasion, having "started out reflecting the high-minded spiritual philosophy of its founder, in the hands of one particular group [it] became more and more authoritarian, more and more strident in its conviction that psychosynthesis was the One Truth". That particular group, headed by James Vargiu, "gradually degenerated into a cult in the worst sense of the word," but collapsed in 1980.

A more technical danger is that premature concern with the transpersonal may hamper dealing with personal psychosynthesis: for example, "evoking serenity ... might produce a false sense of well-being and security". Practitioners have noted how "inability to ... integrate the superconscious contact with everyday experience easily leads to inflation", and have spoken of "an 'Icarus complex', the tendency whereby spiritual ambition fails to take personality limitations into account and causes all sorts of psychological difficulties". As in every approach to spiritual growth or psychological healing, the results depend upon the person involved, and upon the practitioner's ability to discern the stages or state of health, and the needs, of that person. Assagioli himself discussed the issue of psychological disturbances related to spiritual awakening or self-realization, and its diagnosis and treatment, in Chapter 2 of his book Psychosynthesis (1965.)

== Fictional analogies ==
Stephen Potter's "Lifemanship Psycho-Synthesis Clinic", where one may "find the psycho-synthesist lying relaxed on the couch while the patient will be encouraged to walk up and down" would seem a genuine case of "parallel evolution", since its clear targets, as "the natural antagonists...of the lifeplay, are the psychoanalysts".

== Bibliography ==
- Assagioli, R. (1927). · A New Method Of Healing: Psychosynthesis. Published simultaneously in Rome, London and New York. See Assagioli Archives, Florence Italy, Doc. #21965.
- Assagioli, R. (1965). Psychosynthesis: A Manual of Principles and Techniques New York: Hobbs, Dorman & Company, Inc.. There have been several republications and editions of this book by Viking Compass (1971-1976), and Penguin Books (1976-1984): the latest was re-titled Psychosynthesis: A Collection of Basic Writings published The Synthesis Center (2000-2012) ISBN 978-0-967-85700-8.
- _________. (1967). Jung and Psychosynthesis. New York: Psychosynthesis Research Foundation.
- _________. (1973). The Act of Will. New York: Viking Adult. There have been republications and editions of this book by Turnstone Press(1974) ISBN 0-9524004-1-3, Penguin (1977), David Platts (1999) ISBN 978-0952400417, and the latest was by The Synthesis Center (2010) ISBN 978-9678570-6-6-4.
- _________. (1983). Psychosynthesis Typology. London: Institute of Psychosynthesis.
- _________. (2007). Transpersonal Development: The Dimension Beyond Psychosynthesis. Findhorn, Scotland, Inner Way Productions. ISBN 978-0-9530811-2-7.
- _________. (2016). Freedom in Jail. Firenze: Istituto di Psicosintesi.
- _________. (2019). Roberto Assagioli In His Own Words: Fragments of an Autobiography. Firenze: Edizioni Istituto di Psicosintesi.
- _________. (2022). Psychosynthesis of the Couple. Cheshire, MA. Cheshire Cat Books. ISBN 978-0-9882024-4-3.
- _________. (2022). Creating Harmony in Life: A Psychosynthesis Approach. Firenze: Istituto di Psicosintesi. ISBN 979-12-21402-74-2.
- _________. (2022). Subpersonalities: A Collection of Articles. Oslo: Kentaur Publishing. E-Book at https://kennethsorensen.dk/en/product/subpersonalities-a-collection-of-articles/
- _________. (2022). Conflicts, Crises, and Synthesis: A Collection of Articles. Oslo: Kentaur Publishing. E-Book at https://kennethsorensen.dk/en/product/conflicts-crises-and-synthesis/.
- Brown, Molly Young (2004). Unfolding Self: The Practice of Psychosynthesis. Allworth. ISBN 978-1-58115-383-5
- Firman, J., & Gila, A. (1997). The primal wound: A transpersonal view of trauma, addiction, and growth. Albany, NY: State University of New York Press. ISBN 0-7914-3293-9.
- _______________. (2002). Psychosynthesis: A psychology of the spirit. Albany, NY: State University of New York Press.· ISBN 0-7914-5534-3.
- Firman, J., & Gila, A. (2010). A Psychotherapy of Love: Psychosynthesis in Practice. Albany, NY: State University of New York Press. ISBN 978-1-4384-3090-4.
- Jung, C. G. 1954. The Development of Personality, Bollingen Series XX. Princeton, NJ: Princeton University Press. ISBN 978-0-6910183-8-6
- Kuniholm, Jan (editor) (2018). Sharing Wellness: Psychosynthesis for Helping People: Theory and Applications. Cheshire, MA: Cheshire Cat Books. ISBN 978-0-9882024-1-2.
- Maslow, Abraham. (1962). Toward a Psychology of Being. Princeton, N.J.: D. Van Nostrand Company, Inc. ISBN 978-1-6142706-7-6.
- McGuire, William, ed. (1974). The Freud/Jung Letters. Vol. XCIV, Bollingen Series. Princeton, N.J.: Princeton University Press. ISBN 9780691036434
- Nocelli, Petra Guggisberg (2017). The Way of Psychosynthesis. Easton, MD: Synthesis Insights. ISBN 9791220033336.
- _________. (Editor)(2022) Know, Love, Transform Yourself: Theory, Techniques, and New Developments in Psychosynthesis. Psychosynthesis Books. Vol.I (2021) ISBN 9788894643305 and Vol. II (2022) ISBN 9788894643312.
- Parfitt, Will (2003). Psychosynthesis: The Elements and Beyond. Glastonbury. PS Avalon. ISBN 9780954476403.
- Sørensen, Kenneth, (2019). The Seven Types: Psychosynthesis Typology. Oslo, Norway: Kentaur Publishing. ISBN 978-87-92252-39-5.
- Sørensen, Kenneth, (2016). The Soul of Psychosynthesis - The Seven Core Concepts. Kentaur Forlag · ISBN 9788792252173.
- Whitmore, D. (2013) Psychosynthesis Counselling in Action (Counselling in Action series) 2nd Edition. Sage. ISBN 9780761963219
