= Organismic theory =

Set of psychological theories

Organismic theories in psychology are a family of holistic psychological theories which tend to stress the organization, unity, and integration of human beings expressed through each individual's inherent growth or developmental tendency. The idea of an explicitly "organismic theory" dates at least back to the publication of Kurt Goldstein's The organism: A holistic approach to biology derived from pathological data in man in 1934. Organismic theories and the "organic" metaphor were inspired by organicist approaches in biology. The most direct influence from inside psychology comes from Gestalt psychology. This approach is often contrasted with mechanistic and reductionist perspectives in psychology.

== Examples of organismic theories and theorists ==
- Kurt Goldstein's organismic theory
- Ludwig von Bertalanffy's organismic psychology within his general systems theory
- Jean Piaget's theory of cognitive development
- Heinz Werner's orthogenetic principle of development
- Andras Angyal's biospheric model of personality
- Abraham Maslow's holistic-dynamic theory
- Carl Rogers' person-centered therapy and actualizing tendency
- Fritz Perls and Laura Perls's Gestalt therapy
- Edward L. Deci and Richard M. Ryan's self-determination theory
- Murray Bookchin's dialectical naturalism

== See also ==
- Arnold Gesell
- Ego psychology
- G. E. Moore § Organic wholes
- James Mark Baldwin
- John Dewey
- Organic unity
- Organicism
- Phenomenal field theory
