= Language and Language Disturbances =

1948 book by Kurt Goldstein

Language and Language Disturbances: Aphasic Symptom Complexes and Their Significance for Medicine and Theory of Language
- Title page for Language and Language Disturbances: Aphasic Symptom Complexes and Their Significance for Medicine and Theory of Language (1948)
- Author: Kurt Goldstein
- Language: English
- Subject: Psychology
- Publisher: Grune & Stratton
- Publication date: 1948

Language and Language Disturbances: Aphasic Symptom Complexes and Their Significance for Medicine and Theory of Language is a book on aphasia by Dr. Kurt Goldstein, published in 1948. In Language and Language Disturbances, Goldstein theorized that a loss of abstract processing was the core deficit in aphasia.

In his work, Goldstein studied transcortical sensory aphasia (TSA), characterizing it as impaired auditory comprehension, with intact repetition and fluent speech. Goldstein studied word comprehension in patients with aphasia, theorizing that naming shows relatively little specificity to the site of lesion within the left hemisphere.

Goldstein compared patients with damage restricted to the anterior portion of the left hemisphere (whose difficulties are primarily a matter of production) with those with exclusively posterior damage (whose difficulties lie chiefly in comprehension.

Goldstein cited cases where patients experienced semantic confusion and could not verbalize certain words as a result of the brain damage. In one instance, a German patient of Goldstein's who could not name a handkerchief, said instead "nas'putzen" ("to blow one's nose").

== See also ==
- On Aphasia, a book by Sigmund Freud
