= Roberto Assagioli =

Italian psychiatrist and pioneer (1888–1974)

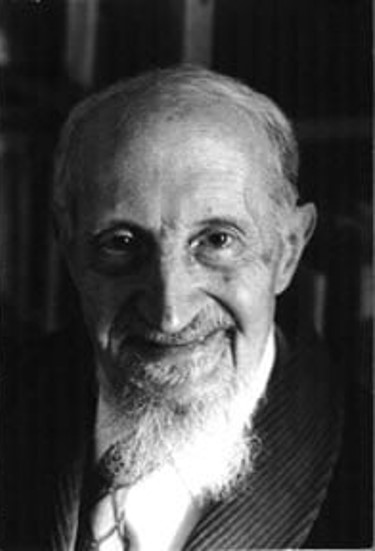
- Born: February 27, 1888; Venice, Italy
- Died: August 23, 1974 (aged 86); Capolona, Italy
- Occupation: Psychiatrist

Roberto Assagioli (27 February 1888 – 23 August 1974) was an Italian psychiatrist in the fields of humanistic and transpersonal psychology. Assagioli founded the psychological movement known as psychosynthesis, which is still being developed today by therapists and psychologists who practice the psychological methods and techniques he developed.

Assagioli's published work in English includes four books and many monographs published as pamphlets as well as numerous lectures and papers in Italian that remain unpublished but which are being translated into English and posted online. His approach to psychosynthesis emphasized the possibility of progressive integration (that is, synthesis) of the personality, as well as the integration of the personality with the Higher Self from which it is derived.

“Psychosynthesis is a dynamic conception of psychic life as a struggle between a multiplicity of disparate, often conflicting forces, and a unifying Center that aims to master and harmoniously organize them.”

In addition, Assagioli's work has been shown to be effectively applicable in such fields as psychotherapy and treatment, medicine, education, organizational development, community development, spiritual life, and personal self-improvement.

Author Piero Ferrucci has said, “As far as I know, Roberto Assagioli is the only individual who has participated personally and actively in the unfurling of two distinct and fundamental revolutions in twentieth-century psychology. The first revolution was the birth of psychoanalysis and depth psychology in the beginning of the century: Assagioli, then a young medical student, presented his MD dissertation on psychoanalysis, wrote in the official Jahrbuch side by side with Freud and Jung, and was part of the Zurich Freud Society, the group of early psychoanalytical pioneers. The idea of unconscious processes in the mind made a lasting impression on him, an impression which he later developed into a variety of hypotheses well beyond the boundaries of orthodox psychoanalysis.

The second revolution in which Assagioli participated was the creation of humanistic and transpersonal psychology in the 1960’s. A. H. Maslow was the pioneer of these new developments. The main idea was simple: rather than focusing on pathology in order to define the human being (as psychoanalysis had all too often done), or on the structural similarities between the human and the animal nervous system (as behaviorism suggested), the humanistic and transpersonal point of view, while not denying the findings of the other schools, put the main emphasis on the organism’s striving for wholeness, on the human being’s potential for growth, expansion of consciousness, health, love and joy.”

== Life ==
Assagioli was born on 27 February 1888 in Venice, Italy, from a middle-class, Jewish background. He was born Roberto Marco Grego, the son of Elena Kaula and Leone Greco. However, his biological father died when Assagioli was two years old, and his mother remarried to Dr. Alessandro Emanuele Assagioli soon afterward. Assagioli was exposed to many creative outlets at a young age, such as art and music, which were believed to have inspired his work in Psychosynthesis. He was born with a clubfoot which his step-father straightened without surgery. He was very physically active in his youth, particularly in mountain climbing, swimming and rowing.

He grew up speaking Italian, French and English, which were spoken on alternate days in his home. By the age of 18, he had learned eight different languages, including his native Italian, English, French, Russian, Greek, Latin, German, and Sanskrit. It was at this age that he began to travel, mainly to other parts of Italy as well as England, France, Switzerland and Germany. He also had what he called “an adventure” in traveling for a short time in Russia, where he was exposed to Russian psychology and learned of the very unstable social situation there.

The Assagioli family moved from Venice to Florence in 1904 in order for Roberto to enroll in the Institute of Higher Studies, which became years later a division of the University of Florence. As a young man Assagioli read voraciously and decided on a career in neurology and psychiatry, and the institute was well equipped for such studies, having a psychology laboratory and museum even though there was no formal curriculum in “psychology.” Assagioli chose psychoanalysis for the subject of his doctoral thesis and persuaded his professors to allow this even though this topic was virtually unknown in Italy at the time.

He took his medical degree in 1910. He was considered by Freud and Jung to be among the first advocates of psychoanalysis in Italy, however he criticized aspects of it in his dissertation and later disavowed specific theories that Freud had while continuing to appreciate and use the methods of psychoanalysis. During and after his education in Florence he studied for two years at the Burghölzli Clinic in Zurich under Eugen Bleuler, and while there he met C.G. Jung, with whom he began a cordial friendship that lasted 50 years. He also attended psychoanalytic conferences in Germany and Switzerland and was a member of Freudian Society of Zurich. He submitted essays (in German) to two journals of Freudian psychoanalysis, Zentralblatt für Psychoanalyse and Jahrbuch far psychoanalytische und psycbopathologische Forschung. However, by 1911 he had already seen the limitations of Freudian theory and began to distance himself from it, three years before Jung formally broke with Freud.

Also during his early years in Florence he established a friendship with Giovanni Papini and was an active contributor to Papini's magazine Leonardo until the magazine closed in 1907. His readings during this time included studies of Eastern philosophy and religion, especially the Bhagavad-Gita, which he considered wonderful.

Assagioli was actively connected to the theosophical movement from this time, and was probably influenced by it earlier, since his mother had an interest in it. Roberto's connection was to ripen into a more direct involvement later in his life. He also developed a friendship with Giuseppe Prezzolini, with whom he became involved as a contributor to the magazine La Voce.

Shortly after his graduation from medical school Assagioli founded a “magazine of psychological studies” called Psiche, of which he was editor and a major contributor. This work came to a close with the advent of World War I. Assagioli was drafted into the Italian army and served as a medical lieutenant at the Austrian front. Because of his physical disabilities (he had flat feet and had to wear a brace) he was exempted from “front line service” and served in the rear. Little is known about his activities at this time because he never spoke of his war experience. It is likely that he was present at two major operations of this part of the war: the Battle of Caporetto, a major defeat for the Italians, and the Battle of Vittorio Veneto, which was an Allied victory and contributed to the end of the war. We do know that Assagioli did not carry a weapon, and crafted a “replica” of either soap or wood and carried it in a holster to appear to conform to military requirements.

When the war was over, Assagioli married. However, the marriage turned out to be a poor match for both, as they lived in different social and spiritual worlds, and ended in divorce. In his autobiographical reflections years later, he noted that his first wife remarried to an army officer and that marriage worked well for her.

In 1922, he married a young woman named Nella Ciapetti, who was a Roman Catholic but also shared an interest in theosophy with Assagioli. She owned a villa with surrounding land in Capolona, where the family would spend their summers for decades. Nella was an industrious and competent person who managed the family business, which included orchards and wine making. They had one son, Ilario Assagioli, who was born in 1923.

In 1926 the Assagioli family moved to Rome. At this time both Roberto and Nella had been writing articles for the theosophical magazine Ultra, and Roberto had become connected with the Arcane School of Alice Bailey, which was an offshoot of the theosophical movement. In the 1920s Assagioli began to crystallize his psychological ideas, which had roots as far back as 1909 with his work in psychoanalysis and “psychagogy,” which he had adopted from a concept of Plato’s that combined theory and practice with a focus on healthy people rather than on pathology.

Also in 1926 he founded The Institute of Culture and Psychic Therapy in Rome, which had a program envisaged in his earlier writings on psychagogy, and it was supported by some influential people. In the following year he published A New Method of Healing: Psychosynthesis, which was the first public mention of the psychological approach with which he would thereafter be identified. In 1933 the Institute’s name was changed to Institute of Psychosynthesis, which it has retained to the present. At the Institute in the 1930s Assagioli presented a series of lectures of psychosynthesis and other topics, published many papers concerned with psychological issues and began outreach to establish interactions with other related disciplines.

Meanwhile, Italy had been ruled since 1922 by Benito Mussolini and his Fascist government. Assagioli's activities were largely ignored by the government until the mid-1930s when it began to take notice of Assagioli’s international contacts and what it viewed as suspicious “humanitarian and spiritual activities.” Assagioli's Institute was closed in 1938, at the same time that Germany was actively beginning to persecute Jews and Italy became more closely tied to Germany.

In 1940, Assagioli was arrested and imprisoned by Benito Mussolini's Fascist government, having been accused of "praying for peace and inviting others to join him along with other international crimes." He was placed in a solitary cell in Regina Coeli prison for 27 nights, until he was released and returned to his family. He was able to use his prison experience as an extended spiritual exercise that was ultimately one of the most significant events of his life. His notes from during and after his imprisonment were later collected and translated in the brief book Freedom in Jail. Among those notes is this observation:

"I realized that I was free to take one attitude or another towards the situation, to give it one value or another, to utilize it or not in one or another way . . .I could rebel inwardly or curse; or I could submit passively, vegetating; or I could indulge in the unwholesome pleasure of self-pity and assume the martyr’s role; or I could take the situation in a sporting way and with a sense of humor, considering it as a novel and interesting experience (what the Germans call an erlebnis)[an experience]. I could make it a rest cure; or a period of intense thinking either about personal matters, reviewing my past life and pondering on it, or about scientific and philosophical problems; or I could take advantage of the condition in order to submit myself to a definite training of my psychological faculties and make psychological experiments on myself; or finally as a spiritual retreat . . . I had the clear sure perception that this was entirely my own affair; that I was free to choose any or several of these attitudes and activities; that this choice would have definite and unavoidable effects which I could foresee, and for which I was fully responsible. There was no doubt in my mind about this essential freedom and power and their inherent privileges and responsibilities. A responsibility towards myself, towards my fellow mankind and towards life itself or God."

During World War II, his family's farm in Capolona, Italy was bombed, and after the Nazis began direct control of northern Italy and began rounding up all Jews, both he and his son went into hiding in the Catenaia Alps (in the province of Arezzo) and in the Upper Tiber Valley. He was sheltered by various farmers and local people and helped by British paratroopers working behind enemy lines. His son Ilario, who had tuberculosis, died in 1952 at the age of 28 as his disease was probably aggravated by the severe stress from the harsh living conditions during the war.

After the war ended, Assagioli returned to his work as a psychiatrist and psychotherapist, deciding to take up residence at a villa in Florence, which became both the Assagioli home and the headquarters of the Psychosynthesis Institute. The years after the war were relatively calm, and it was during this time that he founded various foundations dedicated to Psychosynthesis in Europe and North America, including the Psychosynthesis Research Foundation in the United States. He also began to gather students in Italy and encouraged the opening of psychosynthesis centers at various locations around the country.

Assagioli lived a long and prosperous life, marked by a wide range of human contacts with people on every continent, and he kept himself informed and abreast of the new developments in psychology for the rest of his life. In this regard he played an active part, being on the original editorial boards of both the Journal of Humanistic Psychology and the Journal of Transpersonal Psychology. In fact, the American Psychological Association's Division of Psychotherapy voted and intended to name Assagioli for its 1970 award in its Great Therapists series, but because Assagioli was unable to travel to America to receive the award, it was presented to Erich Fromm.

According to author and Assagioli's personal student Piero Ferrucci, "“Richness in contacts and interchanges was quite important in Assagioli’s background: consider such diverse acquaintances (some of them brief, others lasting) as Italian idealist Benedetto Croce, Russian esotericist P. D. Ouspensky, German philosopher Hermann Keyserling, Indian poet Rabindranath Tagore, Sufi mystic Inhayat Khan, Zen Scholar D. T. Suzuki, Tibet’s explorer Alexandra David Neel, plus psychologists Viktor Frankl, the founder of logotherapy, Robert Desoille, creator of the guided daydream, and C. G. Jung himself, before and after his break with psychoanalysis. Such contacts, coupled with a life of experimentation and reflection, provided an undoubtedly wide perspective for Assagioli’s creation, which he called Psychosynthesis.”

Assagioli lived with his wife Nella at the villa in Florence, spending their summers in Capolona, for the remainder of their lives. Nella died in 1973, and Roberto died at age 86 on 23 August 1974.

Assagioli did not like to discuss his personal life, as he preferred to be remembered for his work. Very few biographical accounts about the life of Assagioli are available, and most are not in English. He did consent to dictate an autobiography to American Dr. Eugene Smith toward the end of his life, thinking that there may be some value to students in some of the events of his life, however he died shortly after the first interviews were completed. The recordings thus made were compiled, edited and printed as Roberto Assagioli In His Own Words in 2019. Also a major non-technical biography, Roberto Assagioli: The Life and Work of the Founder of Psychosynthesis by Paola Giovetti, published in Italian in 1995, was translated into English and published in 2024.

== Psychosynthesis ==
=== Inspiration and development ===
Assagioli is famous for founding and developing psychosynthesis, a spiritual and holistic approach to psychology that evolved from psychoanalysis. He was inspired by Freud's ideas of the unconscious and Jung's theories of the collective unconscious, however the concepts in psychosynthesis will be seen to be analogous to those found in the Christian mystics, Vedanta philosophy and yoga, sufism and a wide range of other thought in philosophy and practical psychology. One of his primary influences was that of American psychologist and philosopher William James.

Trained in psychoanalysis but unsatisfied by what he regarded as its incompleteness as a whole, Assagioli felt that love, wisdom, creativity, and will were among the important components of the personality that were not included in psychoanalysis. Assagioli's earliest development of what became Psychosynthesis started in 1906, when he began his formal education in psychology. He continued his work on Psychosynthesis right up until his death. Freud and Assagioli were known to have corresponded, although they never had the chance to meet.

Assagioli said, "Psychosynthesis presupposes psychoanalysis, or rather, includes it as a first and necessary stage." However, Assagioli disagreed with specific theories formulated by Sigmund Freud that he considered limiting. He refused to accept Freud's materialism, reductionism and neglect of the positive dimensions of the personality. Psychosynthesis became the first approach born of psychoanalysis that also included the artistic, altruistic and heroic potentials of the human being. Assagioli's work was more in alignment with that of fellow psychoanalytic "heretic" Carl Jung, with whom he had a cordial relationship that began in 1906 and lasted until Jung's death. Both Assagioli and Jung validated the importance of the spiritual level of human existence. Assagioli shared with Jung the insight that psychological symptoms can be triggered by spiritual dynamics. Assagioli considered Jung's theories to be closest to his understanding of psychosynthesis. Assagioli drew inspiration for psychosynthesis from his month-long incarceration in solitary confinement in 1940. He used his time in prison to exercise his mental will by meditating daily. He concluded that he was able to change his punishment into an opportunity to investigate his inner-self.

Assagioli developed psychosynthesis from his early ideas of “psychagogy,” a concept which he borrowed from Plato, to indicate a discipline that was both theoretical and practical. He wrote on the subject of “The Psychology of Idea-Forces and Psychagogy” in the Journal of Applied Psychology in 1909, and developed his thought until “Psychosynthesis” was publicly introduced in his 1927 pamphlet, “A New Method of Healing: Psychosynthesis.” This broad discipline became the core of his work in psychology for the rest of his life. He founded psychosynthesis teaching and training centers in Rome, Florence, and supported the establishment of such centers in Europe, North America, and elsewhere.

=== Psychology Today interview ===
In the December 1974 issue of Psychology Today, Assagioli was interviewed by Sam Keen, in which Assagioli discussed the differences between Freudian psychoanalysis and psychosynthesis:

We pay far more attention to the higher unconscious and to the development of the transpersonal self. In one of his letters Freud said, "I am interested only in the basement of the human being." Psychosynthesis is interested in the whole building. We try to build an elevator which will allow a person access to every level of his personality. After all, a building with only a basement is very limited. We want to open up the terrace where you can sun-bathe or look at the stars. Our concern is the synthesis of all areas of the personality. That means psychosynthesis is holistic, global and inclusive. It is not against psychoanalysis or even behavior modification but it insists that the needs for meaning, for higher values, for a spiritual life, are as real as biological or social needs. We deny that there are any isolated human problems.

Assagioli noted that Carl Jung, "of all modern psychotherapists, is the closest in theory and practice to psychosynthesis", and further expanded on the similarities between his own and Jung's views:

In the practice of therapy we both agree in rejecting 'pathologism' that is, concentration upon morbid manifestations and symptoms of a supposed psychological 'disease'. We regard man as a fundamentally healthy organism in which there may be temporary malfunctioning. Nature is always trying to re-establish harmony, and within the psyche the principle of synthesis is dominant. Irreconcilable opposites do not exist. The task of therapy is to aid the individual in transforming the personality and integrating apparent contradictions. Both Jung and myself have stressed the need for a person to develop the higher psychic functions, the spiritual dimension.

He also highlighted the differences between Jung's work and psychosynthesis:

Perhaps the best way to state our differences is with a diagram of the psychic functions. Jung differentiates four functions: sensation, feeling, thought, and intuition. Psychosynthesis says that Jung's four functions do not provide for a complete description of the psychological life. Our view can be visualized like this: We hold that outside imagination or fantasy is a distinct function. There is also a group of functions that impels us toward action in the outside world. This group includes instincts, tendencies, impulses, desires, and aspirations. And here we come to one of the central foundations of psychosynthesis: There is a fundamental difference between drives, impulses, desires, and the will. In the human condition there are frequent conflicts between desire and will. And we will place the will in a central position at the heart of self-consciousness or the ego.

Assagioli asserted about the will:

The will is not merely assertive, aggressive, and controlling. There is the accepting will, yielding will, the dedicated will. You might say that there is a feminine polarity to the will – the willing surrender, the joyful acceptance of the other functions of the personality.

At the end of the interview, Keen himself concluded:

It is hard to know what counts as evidence for the validity of a world view and the therapeutic it entails. Every form of therapy has dramatic successes and just as dramatic failures. Enter as evidence in the case for psychosynthesis an ad hominem argument: in speaking about death there was no change in the tone or intensity of Assagioli's voice and the light still played in his dark eyes, and his mouth was never very far from a smile.

== Spiritual work and parapsychology ==
Assagioli was also interested and active in the field of consciousness and transpersonal work. Having studied theosophy and Eastern philosophy, his written work developed different meditation techniques, including reflective, receptive and creative meditation. He wrote on a variety of spiritual topics for several periodicals, including the Hibbert Journal, The Beacon, Ultra (An Italian periodical devoted to theosophy), Medicina Psicosomatica (Psychosomatic Medicine), and the Journal of Transpersonal Psychology, of which he was a member of the original editorial board. He also contributed to several spiritual groups in the tradition known as the "ageless wisdom."

He founded two groups intended to teach meditation based on the ideas of the New Age teacher Alice Bailey: The Group for Creative Meditation and the Meditation Group for the New Age, for which he wrote essays and a basic teaching/training manual. He was also a co-founder of the School for Esoteric Studies, intended to teach the work of Alice Bailey at an advanced level. He was the direct inspiration for the founding of at least two meditation centers: Sundial House in the UK, and Meditation Mount in California, USA.

Assagioli maintained a lifelong interest in paranormal phenomena and parapsychology, some of which he regarded as having been sufficiently demonstrated — as psychological facts — so as to be regarded as legitimate subjects for scientific study. He wrote numerous essays on such phenomena, many of which he investigated personally, beginning with the then-famous case of the “thinking horses of Elberfeld,” which he witnessed during a trip to Germany in 1913 and about which he published a series of articles in the magazine Psiche. Assagioli regarded his own work as genuinely scientific and began writing on scientific activity along his critique of modern reductionist, materialist science with an essay (in Italian) titled “Gli Errori Degli Scienziati” or “The Errors of Scientists," published in Psiche in July–August 1913. In this article he advocated the need for clear thought and appropriate conceptions in theory and practice. In 1961 he wrote several essays and gave a talk on “parapsychological faculties” in which he asserts that “Parapsychological faculties are generally regarded as something exceptional, extraordinary and marvelous, but this does not correspond to the truth, and I aim precisely to highlight their universality and normality.”

Assagioli states, “Psychosynthesis includes parapsychology without reservation in its integral conception of the psyche and in its techniques of strengthening all functions: bio-psycho-spiritual. This inclusion is one of the characteristics that most differentiate Psychosynthesis from other psychological conceptions and from other methods of psychotherapy.”

An e-Book has been published that contains a collection of Assagioli's thought in this area, titled Psychosynthesis and Parapsychology.

During this period Assagioli also became active in progressive Judaism. He had never been the member of a synagogue or associated with orthodox organizations, although he had a personal relationship with Martin Buber and other prominent members of the Jewish community and was welcomed in synagogues when he visited them in Italy or other countries. He delivered several talks and wrote papers concerning the role of the Jews in the world and his home was the headquarters of the Italian Union for Progressive Judaism. He was quite enthusiastic about the possibilities for Judaism being a catalyst for world peace, and was opposed to any kind of militant or nationalistic Zionism.

== Published works ==
Assagioli's published works number in the hundreds, many of which were written in Italian or French for European periodicals from 1903 to 1974. His most well-known works are as follows:

- 1927 – Psychosynthesis – A New Method of Healing by Roberto Assagioli. Booklet. Institute of Psychosynthesis, Rome, Italy & Lucis Publishing Company, New York, USA (English)
- 1965 – Psychosynthesis: A Manual of Principles and Techniques by Roberto Assagioli - republished in 2000 as Psychosynthesis: A Collection of Basic Writings by Roberto Assagioli ISBN 0-9678570-0-7 (English)
- 1966 – Per l'armonia della vita. La psicosintesi by Roberto Assagioli. Istituto di Psiconsintesi, Firenze, Italy (Italian)
- 1973 – The Act of Will by Roberto Assagioli ISBN 0-670-10309-8 (English)
- 1993 – Transpersonal Development: The Dimension Beyond Psychosynthesis ISBN 1-85538-291-1 (English)
- 2007 – Transpersonal Development: The Dimension Beyond Psychosynthesis by Roberto Assagioli - (new translation in English) ISBN 978-0-9530811-2-7
- 2016 – (Freedom in Jail by Roberto Assagioli. ed. by Catherine Ann Lombard, Istituto di Psiconsintesi, Firenze, Italy (English)
- 2019 - Psychosynthesis of the Couple by Roberto Assagioli, ed. by Jan Kuniholm ISBN 978-0-9882024-4-3
- 2024 - Creating Harmony in Life by Roberto Assagioli. Ed. by Catherine Ann Lombard, Istituto di Psiconsintesi, Firenze, Italy ISBN 979-12-214-0274-2
