= Self-fulfillment =

Realizing of one's deepest desires and capacities

In philosophy and psychology, self-fulfillment is the realizing of one's deepest desires and capacities. The history of this concept can be traced to Ancient Greek philosophers and it still remains a notable concept in modern philosophy.

== Definition ==
Philosopher Alan Gewirth in his book Self-Fulfillment defined self-fulfillment as "carrying to fruition one's deepest desires or one's worthiest capacities." Another definition states that self-fulfillment is "the attainment of a satisfying and worthwhile life well lived." It is an ideal that can be traced to Ancient Greek philosophers, and one that has been common and popular in both Western and non-Western cultures. Self-fulfillment is often considered as superior to other values and goals.

== Philosophy ==
Gewirth noted that "to seek for a good human life is to seek for self-fulfillment". However, in modern philosophy, the ideal of self-fulfillment has become less popular, criticized by thinkers such as Hobbes and Freud, who feel there are conceptual and moral problems associated with it. It has been called an egoistic concept, impossible to achieve, with some suggesting that it is an obsolete concept that should be abandoned. Furthermore, moral philosophers focus less on obtaining a good life, and more on interpersonal relations and duties owed to others. Similarly, whereas Plato and Aristotle saw the goal of the polis in providing a means of self-fulfillment to citizens, modern governments have given up on that, focusing rather on maintaining civic order. Despite the criticism, the concept of self-fulfillment still persists in modern philosophy, its usefulness defended by thinkers such as Gewirth himself.

Gewirth also noted that the term self-fulfillment has two near synonyms: self-realization and self-actualization, used respectively by philosophers and humanist psychologists, whereas the term self-fulfillment is more commonly used outside those expert fields. Gewirth however argues that this concept is sufficiently different from those others to merit not being used as a synonym. Self-actualization in particular, often discussed in the context of Maslow's hierarchy of needs, is frequently defined as the "need for self-fulfillment".

When it comes to the relationships with other factors, self-fulfillment has been positively connected to altruism.

== See also ==
- Civic engagement
- Intentional living
- Life satisfaction
- Self-fulfilling prophecy
