= Donald Snygg =

Teacher (1904–1967)

Donald Snygg (September 24, 1904 – February 1, 1967) was a teacher, a scholar, and a successful basketball and football coach. He is best known for and identified with the beginnings of Phenomenological Psychology.

== Early years ==
Donald Snygg (born Oram Donald Snygg) was the second child and first son of Edward Emil Snygg and Florence Woolston Snygg, merchants in Magnet, Nebraska. His older sister, Rachael, was a teacher and homemaker. His younger brother, Edward (Ned), manufactured and fitted artificial limbs.

Snygg received his primary and secondary education in a one-room schoolhouse and in 1924 obtained his B.A. from the Nebraska State Teachers' College (now Wayne State College) in Wayne, Nebraska. He attended summer school at Columbia University in 1926 and spent additional summers between 1929 and 1932 at the University of Iowa where he earned his M.A.

Between 1924 and 1930, he was a science instructor at Randolph High School in Randolph, Nebraska. He was also the school's principal from 1925 to 1930, and as basketball and football coach, he led Randolph's teams to a series of winning seasons remembered by some as the Snygg Era.

In 1930, Snygg was hired as Superintendent of Public Schools in Verdigre, Nebraska, but in 1933, as the Depression deepened, the School Board, in good conscience, could no longer employ both Snygg and his wife. The Snyggs resigned and moved to Canada where he began his doctoral studies.

== Graduate school ==
At the University of Toronto, Snygg studied psychology under K. S. Bernhardt, E. A. Bott, and W. Line. He conducted experiments in learning with humans and rats. Rats, he found, preferred a simple path to their goal over a shorter but more complicated path. Snygg completed his Ph.D. at Toronto in 1935 and stayed on to lecture and do research there for the next two years while also serving as Psychologist to the Toronto Juvenile Court.

== Oswego years ==
In 1937, Snygg joined the faculty of Oswego State Normal School (now SUNY Oswego) in Oswego, New York as chairman of the Psychology Department. Snygg often used summers to teach at other institutions, including, Columbia University, the University of Florida in Gainesville, Florida, the University of Illinois in Champaign–Urbana, Illinois, and the University of Wisconsin in Madison, Wisconsin. Snygg remained at Oswego until his untimely death in 1967 from a massive heart attack, suffered while shoveling snow. His many contributions to the community and State of New York are documented in his obituary.

== Phenomenological psychology ==
In a seminal article, published in Psychological Review in 1941, Snygg asserted that past theories of personality had failed and that a new approach was needed. He argued that, to understand why people behave as they do, it is essential to understand how they see the world. To predict and influence how they might behave in the future, one needs to understand the mechanisms by which this world view changes. Other publications followed, most notably the book Individual Behavior, co-authored with Arthur Combs and published in 1949. Snygg's work on personality is often connected with that of other pioneers in the field, including Gordon Allport and Carl Rogers. About Snygg's phenomenological psychology, C. George Boeree wrote: "(it) fails to gain the attention it deserves because it is too simple, too clear, too practical."

== Family ==
While Snygg was principal of Randolph High School, he hired Elaine Morrow, of Iowa, as the school's home economics teacher. In 1927, they married.

Don and Elaine had three children, all of whom followed academic careers. John Morrow Snygg taught mathematics and physics, first at Hunter College in New York City, and then at Upsala College in East Orange, New Jersey, and authored books on Clifford Algebra. Charles Edward Snygg also became a mathematics teacher, first at Morehouse College in Atlanta, Georgia, then at Humboldt State University in Arcata, California, and later worked as an engineer at Lockheed-Martin in Sunnyvale, California. Frances Louise Snygg (named after a family friend, Canadian mystery writer Frances Shelley Wees) became a modern dance teacher and Associate Dean of the Faculty at Indiana University in Bloomington, Indiana.

After Elaine died, Snygg married zoologist Carlita Nesslinger Georgia, who brought two daughters, Fredericka Georgia and Deborah Georgia, into the family.

== Legacy ==
In late 1966, months before his death, Snygg was designated University Professor, a position shared by only a select few in the SUNY system.

Two scholarships, The Donald Snygg Scholar-Athlete Award, in recognition of his support of intercollegiate athletics at Oswego, and The Donald Snygg Graduate Scholarship, for post-graduate students of psychology, were established in his name.

During the period 1968–2014, a building named Snygg Hall, in his honor, stood on campus at SUNY Oswego.
