= Phenomenal field theory =

Theory in psychology

The phenomenal field

Phenomenal field theory is a contribution to the psychology of personality proposed by Donald Snygg and Arthur W. Combs. According to this theory, all behavior is determined by the conscious self, described as "the phenomenal field" of the behaving organism, and can only be understood if the researcher sees the world through the individual's eyes and mind. As the saying goes "You cannot understand a person until you've walked a mile in their shoes".

== Description ==
The phenomenal field (or self) is our subjective reality, all that we are aware of, the "field" of our experiences, including objects and people, and our behaviors, thoughts, images, and ideas like justice, equality, and so on. Snygg and Combs emphasize that self is the true subject-matter for psychology.

According to the authors, motivation is "the basic need of everyone to preserve and enhance the phenomenal self, and the characteristics of all parts of the field are governed by this need".

Learning(L) takes place through differentiation, being a matter of improving the quality of one's experiences by extracting some meaningful detail from the confusion that surrounds us.

== Psychopathology ==
Psychopathology is caused by a threat, which is the awareness of a menace to the phenomenal self. If the person reacts appropriately to the threat, mental health is preserved. If not, the threat leads to defenses, neurotic and psychotic symptoms, and even criminal behavior. Consequently, psychotherapy consists of freeing clients from inappropriate perceptions, behaviors, cognitions, and emotions they have set up to protect themselves from threat.

== See also ==
- Cognitive-affective personality system
- Hypostatic model of personality
- Organismic theory
- Personality systematics
