= Kurt Goldstein =

German neurologist and psychiatrist

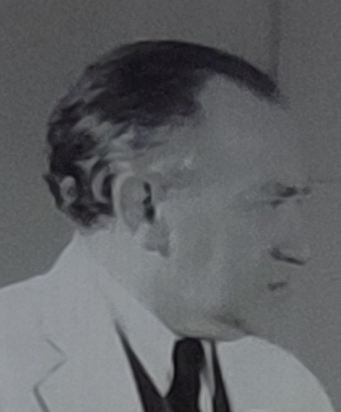
- Born: November 6, 1878; Kattowitz, German Empire (now Katowice, Poland)
- Died: September 19, 1965 (aged 86); New York City, U.S.
- Education: University of Breslau, University of Heidelberg
- Known for: Holistic theory of the organism, self-actualization, neuropsychology
- Notable work: The Organism (1934) *Human Nature in the Light of Psychopathology (1940)
- Scientific career
- Fields: Neurology, Psychiatry, Psychology
- Workplaces: University of Frankfurt, Berlin-Moabit General Hospital, Harvard University, Tufts Medical School, Columbia University, Montefiore Hospital
- Notable students: Fritz Perls

Kurt Goldstein (November 6, 1878 – September 19, 1965) was a German neurologist and psychiatrist who created a holistic theory of the organism. Educated in medicine, Goldstein studied under Carl Wernicke and Ludwig Edinger where he focused on neurology and psychiatry. His clinical work helped inspire the establishment of The Institute for Research into the Consequences of Brain Injuries. Goldstein was forced to leave Germany when Adolf Hitler came to power because of his Jewish heritage. After being displaced, Goldstein wrote The Organism (1934). This focused on patients with psychological disorders, particularly cases of schizophrenia and war trauma, and the ability of their bodies to readjust to substantial losses in central control. His holistic approach to the human organism produced the principle of self actualization, defined as the driving force that maximizes and determines the path of an individual. Later, his principle influenced Abraham Maslow's hierarchy of needs. He was the co-editor of Journal of Humanistic Psychology.

== Biography ==
=== Early life ===
Goldstein was born into a Jewish family in Kattowitz, German Empire, the seventh of nine children. He lived in Upper Silesia in the eastern part of the German Empire with his family. Goldstein's father was a successful owner of a lumberyard. Although not formally educated, Goldstein's father held scholarship in high regard. He felt that a good education was the most proper way to prepare for life, and because of this, he ensured that all his sons obtained university degrees.

As a child, Goldstein was described as being shy, quiet, and bookish amidst his bustling surroundings. His love of reading earned him the nickname of "Professor" at the public school he attended in Kattowitz. The Goldstein family relocated to the metropolitan city of Breslau after a few years, where Goldstein attended the Humanistische Gymnasium. After graduation, Goldstein planned to study philosophy at the university level. His father did not approve of this venture, as he considered it an unprofitable art, and sent Goldstein to work at a relative's business.

=== Academic career ===
After a short period working at that business, Goldstein's father reluctantly allowed him to enroll at Breslau University. Goldstein stayed there for only one semester before he transferred to the University of Heidelberg where he was able to pursue the study of Neo-Kantian philosophy and literature, where he was introduced to the concepts of Carl Wernicke. One year later, Goldstein made his way back to Breslau, where he studied medicine, much to his father's satisfaction. Under the instruction of Wernicke, Goldstein focused his study on neurology and psychiatry. Goldstein obtained his medical degree at the age of 25.

In 1903, Ludwig Edinger invited Goldstein to the Senckebergisches Neurologisches Institut at the University of Frankfurt where he became Edinger's assistant (Oct 1903 – Sept 1904). Edinger became one of the most influential figures in Goldstein's career. After a stint in Königsberg, Goldstein returned to work with Edinger in 1914 at the Neurological Institute in Frankfurt as first assistant. Their goal was to investigate comparative neuroanatomy and neuropathology. After Edinger's death in 1918, Goldstein became acting director of the Neurological Institute. From 1917 to 1927, Goldstein yielded conceptual aspects of neurological conditions, including tonus disturbances, agnosia, aphasia, apraxia, and general behavioral changes after a brain injury. In July 1922, he was appointed associate professor for Neurology and director of the Neurological Institute. In 1923, he assumed the role of professor of neurology.

In 1926, Fritz Perls became Goldstein's assistant for a year. Perls married Laura Posner in 1930. They would go on to become the co-developers of Gestalt therapy. Goldstein's research and theory had a considerable influence on the formation of this new psychotherapy. Later that year, Goldstein accepted a position at the University of Berlin and the director of neurology at Berlin-Moabit General Hospital. The hospital was established for Goldstein's patients to study their neurological conditions.

In 1927, Goldstein was instrumental in organizing the International Society for Psychotherapy.[NAS1] He published material on the roles of the nurse, physician, and social worker for inpatient care of brain-injured patients. In 1938, he was to read the William James Lectures on Philosophy and Psychology at Harvard, and these were later published. He was a clinical professor of neurology at Tufts Medical School. He was active on the staff of the Boston Dispensary's clinic for nervous diseases.

=== Professional career ===
Between 1906 and 1914, Goldstein worked in a psychiatric clinic in Königsberg. Here he realized that the patients were not receiving adequate treatment. During World War I, Goldstein treated a large number of soldiers with traumatic brain injuries at the clinic, and he established The Institute for Research into the Consequences of Brain Injuries in close cooperation with Adhémar Gelb, a gestalt psychologist. The collaboration between the two resulted in sixteen papers, the most notable of which reported on a case of visual agnosia. Goldstein served as the director of the clinic until 1930. It was there that he also developed his theory of brain-mind relationships. He applied the figure-ground principle from perception to the whole organism. In this application, the whole organism existed as the ground for the individual stimulus that formed the figure. This idea became an early criticism of the simple behavioral stimulus-response-theory.

When Hitler was appointed chancellor in 1933, Goldstein, was arrested and imprisoned in a basement. After a week, he was released on the condition that he would agree to leave the country immediately and never return. For the next year, Goldstein lived in Amsterdam, supported by the Rockefeller Foundation, and wrote his classic The Organism.

Goldstein immigrated to the United States of America in October 1934 and became a citizen in April 1941. He worked at the Psychiatric Institute in New York City, Montefiore Hospital as attending neurologist and made connections with Columbia University in New York. Between 1940 and 1945, Goldstein worked at the Tufts Medical School in Boston as the clinical professor of neurology. In 1946, he returned to New York City, where he established a private practice.

While in the United States, Goldstein coined the phrase "self actualization". Goldstein met American psychologist Abraham Maslow, who was at Brandeis University. Maslow became greatly influenced by Goldstein's ideas, particularly self-actualization. Later, this principle would become a fundamental concept in Maslow's "Need – Hierarchy Theory of Motivation". Self-actualization was an essential component to Maslow's Hierarchy of Needs, but differed from Goldstein's original concept. Maslow described self-actualization as realizing one's full potential and seeking personal growth. Maslow felt that self-actualization would only be met if all fundamental needs had been satisfied first.

==== Holistic approach ====
Goldstein's holistic approach is described in his book The Organism. Rather than looking at certain phenomena, such as the patellar reflex, as singular events, Goldstein tried to understand them as components of a holistic organism. Although he believed it was possible that reflexes could exist by themselves, Goldstein's approach postulated that they always exist in concurrence with another process in the body. While hitting the kneecap with a rubber hammer or testing the pupillary response might seem to be a simple example of an isolated reflex, Goldstein argued that a holistic approach would be necessary to fully understand what the body is experiencing. In an excerpt from The Organism, he writes:

If, in examining a man's pupillary reflex, we obtain a relatively constant contraction of the iris, this is possible only because the individual, so to speak, surrenders his eye to us and completely foregoes the usual act of seeing, i.e. the visual prehension of some environmental feature. Of course, it is true that in real vision, the diameter of the pupil changes according to the amount of light on the seen object. But it certainly is not true that the same light intensity will produce the same contraction when it affects the organ in isolation (as in the reflex examination), and when it acts upon the eye of the person who deliberately regards objects. Although it is not easy to prove this experimentally, one only needs to contrast the pupillary reaction of a man looking interestedly at a brightly illuminated object with the reaction of an eye which has been exposed "in isolation," to the same light intensity. The difference in pupillary reaction is immediately manifest.

Goldstein asserts that, when observing a phenomenon within an organism, humans instinctively isolate that observation from the context in an attempt to understand it better. Yet, in doing so, they miss the essence or intrinsic nature of the organism. Rather than attempting to understand single facets of a situation, Goldstein believes it is essential to understand the situation in which the phenomenon arose.

To illustrate this idea, Goldstein gives the example of a person first learning how to ride a bicycle. Initially, the person will attempt various motions in an attempt to succeed. While some motions fail to manifest in success, eventually the individual will understand how to coordinate their body in respect to the bicycle, and ride it successfully. While a smoothly propelled bicycle may signify accomplishment, looking at the coordinated movements of the learner and the smile that results is also another sign. Thus, when looking at a single aspect of a phenomenon instead of the whole, Goldstein argues one misses the true nature of the phenomenon.

==== Methodology ====
Goldstein developed an approach whereby a situation or phenomenon is analyzed holistically, rather than simply looking at an isolated event. First, when observing a situation, interpretations should be taken as a whole without giving special preference to one part of the phenomenon. When describing the phenomenon, attention should not be diverted to one aspect of the phenomenon that may be of interest. The holistic approach calls instead for the phenomenon to be described from all angles without bias toward one part. Lastly, Goldstein argues that one must consider each and every phenomenon in reference to the entire situation.

=== Death ===
He died in New York City in 1965.

== Major contributions to psychology ==
=== Schizophrenia ===
Although trained as a medical doctor, Goldstein pioneered many important advances in psychology. As an early pioneer of neuropsychology, he studied the effects of brain damage on abstraction abilities. His work lead him to conclude that although physical areas of the brain, such as the frontal lobes and the subcortical ganglia, may be damaged, psychological trauma was a more pressing concern. His conclusions on schizophrenia emphasized the disease as a protective mechanism against anxiety rather than an organic defect.

=== War trauma ===
Following the research of German neurologist Hermann Oppenheim, on war-related trauma, Goldstein focused upon understanding the trauma of soldiers returning from duty in World War I. At the time, physicians thought soldiers were merely faking symptoms in order to receive a pension after the war and there was little research to prove otherwise. Goldstein and his team attempted to look at this from a holistic perspective by theorizing that all neural networks were interconnected and thus, connected to the outside world. Therefore, any trauma one receives from the war would directly impact the neural networks.

Goldstein later attempted to rehabilitate patients suffering from war trauma. At the time, suffering veterans were placed in penitentiaries and asylums. Goldstein attempted to bring back the normal function of patients by introducing multidisciplinary care teams consisting of medical, orthopedic, physiological, and psychological personnel, as well as a school facility to provide workshops for patients. His efforts resulted in the successful rehabilitation of many soldiers: 73% of patients were able to return to their old jobs while only 10% remained hospitalized.

== Publications ==
=== Books/monographs ===
- Goldstein, Kurt. (1908). Zur Lehre von der motorischen Apraxie. J. fur Psychol. und Neurol., XI., 169–187, 270–283.
- Goldstein, Kurt. (1934). Der Aufbau des Organismus. Einführung in die Biologie unter besonderer Berücksichtigung der Erfahrungen am kranken Menschen. Den Haag, Nijhoff, 1934.
- Goldstein, Kurt. (1939). The Organism: A Holistic Approach to Biology Derived from Pathological Data in Man. New York: American Book Company.
- Goldstein, Kurt. (1940). Human Nature in the Light of Psychopathology. Cambridge: Harvard University Press.
- Goldstein, Kurt; Scheerer, Martin.(1941): Abstract and Concrete Behavior: An Experimental Study With Special Tests. In: Psychological Monographs, ed. by John F. Dashell, Vol. 53/1941, No. 2 (whole No. 239), p. 1-151.
- Goldstein, Kurt. (1942) After effects of brain injuries in war. New York: Grune & Stratton.
- Goldstein, Kurt., Hanfmann, E., Rickers-Ovsiankina (1944). Case Lanuti: Extreme Concretization of Behavior Due to Damage of the Brain Cortex. In: Psychological Monographs, ed. by John F. Dashell, Vol. 57/1944, No. 4 (whole No. 264), p. 1-72.
- Goldstein, Kurt., Scheerer, M., Rothmann, E. (1945). A Case of "Idiot Savant": An Experimental Study of Personality Organization. In: Psychological Monographs, ed. by John F. Dashell, Vol. 58/1945, No. 4 (whole No. 269), p. 1-63.
- Goldstein, Kurt. (1948). Language and Language Disturbances: Aphasic Symptom Complexes and Their Significance for Medicine and Theory of Language. New York: Grune & Stratton.
- Goldstein, Kurt. (1967). Selected writings. ed., Aron Gurwitsch, Else M. Goldstein.

== See also ==
- Neuropsychology
- Organismic theory
- Gestalt Psychology
- Self-actualization
- Humanistic psychology
