= Heinz Werner (psychologist) =

Austrian developmental psychologist (1890-1964)

- Born: February 11, 1890; Vienna, Austria-Hungary
- Died: May 14, 1964 (aged 74); Worcester, Massachusetts, US

Academic background
- Education: University of Vienna
- Thesis: Zur Psychologie des ästhetischen Genusses (1914)
- Academic advisor: Sigmund Exner

Heinz Werner (February 11, 1890 – May 14, 1964) was a developmental psychologist who also studied perception, aesthetics, and language.

== Early life ==
Werner was born to Emilie Klauber Werner and Leopold Werner, who was a manufacturer by trade. He was the second of four children, and the firstborn son. His father died when he was four, leaving his mother to raise the children. The family; however, did not suffer financially due to provision being made. Both Werner's elementary and high school education was received in Vienna. He had several interests throughout school, including music, particularly the violin, and the sciences. At the age of 10 he became particularly interested in books containing information about the theory of Evolution. These would be the interests that shape his university experiences.

== Education ==
Werner entered Technische Hochschule Wien in 1908 with the intention of becoming an engineer. A year later, in 1909, Werner realized that this was not his desire, and transferred to the University of Vienna with a new plan to become a composer and music historian. While at the university, Werner was exposed to a variety of new materials, and found that he was increasingly interested in philosophy and psychology. From 1912 to 1913, Werner published multiple articles, including "A Genetic Table of Conceptual Forms", his first article. His dissertation was "The Psychology of Esthetic Enjoyment", for which he was awarded a Ph.D. from the University of Vienna and graduated summa cum laude in 1914.

== Career ==
Following graduation, Werner remained at the university as an assistant, working with Sigmund Exner at the university's Institute of Physiology. From 1914 to 1917, following a short-term military service involvement, he conducted research, both at the Ludwig-Maximilians-Universität München and the University of Vienna. This research included rhythmic factors in perception and created melodies by children aged 2.5–5 years of age. In 1917, he became a research assistant to William Stern at the Psychological Institute at Hamburg. Eventually, in 1921, he was given the position of Privatdozent at the University of Hamburg; a position that he remained in for twelve years.

Although involved in many disciplines at the University of Hamburg, the majority of his work fell into perception (including problems with perception), development, and aesthetic-expressive factors in speech. During his time at the university, he was productive in his research, publishing several articles in these fields, and simultaneously carried the title of co-editor of the Zeitschrift für Psychologie. He left the position at Hamburg due to the Nazis in 1933, eventually moving to the United States to accept a position at the University of Michigan.

== Later life ==
For three years, Werner was funded by a grant at the University of Michigan. For a brief year, Werner accepted a position as a visiting professor at Harvard, but returned to Michigan the following year as a senior research psychologist at the Wayne County Training School. While at these two positions, Werner's work remained spread across several interests including: contour, metacontrast, binocular perception of depth, aesthetics, and developmental comparisons between normal functioning children and children with intellectual disability.

Following the death of his wife, he left the university for his first teaching position in the United States at Brooklyn College working on the effects of brain damage in 1942. Five years later, he left the university to take a position at Clark University in the Department of Psychology and Education. His research at the university, as many of his other positions, focused primarily on perception and language, and collaborated with his colleagues Seymour Wapner and Bernard Kaplan on several projects. This was the position he held for the longest, remaining at the university for 17 years.

== Awards ==
- 1955: Ford Foundation Grant of $5,000
- 1956: Elected to Clark chapter of Phi Beta Kappa Society
- 1956: Membership to American Academy of Arts and Sciences
- 1957 Awarded title of Ordentlicher Professor Emeritus at the University of Hamburg
- 1960 Awarded title of Professor Emeritus at Clark University

== Distancing ==
Distancing is a concept arising from the work of developmental psychologists Heinz Werner and Bernard Kaplan to describe the process of establishing a subject's individuality and identity as an essential phase in coming to terms with symbols, referential language and eventually full cognition and linguistic communication. Werner and Kaplan's work was later expanded and edified into more refined therapeutic practice by the pioneer in deaf-blind patient therapy, Dr. Jan Van Dijk, and later refined by the work of Dr. Susan Bruce.

== Selected works ==
- Werner, H. (1937). Process and achievement. Harvard Educational Review, 7, 353-368.
- Werner, H. (1940). Comparative psychology of mental development. NY: International Universities Press, Inc.
- Werner, H. (1944). Development of the visuo-motor performance on the marble board test in mentally retarded children. Journal of Genetic Psychology, 64, 269.
- Werner, H. (1946). The concept of rigidity. Psychological Review, 53, 43-52.
- Werner, H. (1957). The concept of development from a comparative and organismic point of view. In D. Harris (Ed.), The concept of development. Minneapolis, Minn: University of Minnesota Press.
- Werner, H., & Kaplan, B. (1963). Symbol formation: An organismic developmental approach to language and the expression of thought. NY: John Wiley.

== See also ==
- Organismic theory
- Developmental psychology
