= The Organism =

1934 book by Kurt Goldstein

The Organism: A Holistic Approach to Biology Derived from Pathological Data in Man
- Author: Kurt Goldstein
- Original title: Der Aufbau des Organismus. Einführung in die Biologie unter besonderer Berücksichtigung der Erfahrungen am kranken Menschen
- Language: German (1934); English (1939/1995)
- Subject: Psychology
- Publisher: Den Haag, Nijhoff, American Book Company/New York, Zone Books
- Publication date: 1934
- English publication date: 1939/1995
- ISBN: 0942299973

The Organism: A Holistic Approach to Biology Derived from Pathological Data in Man is a book on psychology and neurology by Dr. Kurt Goldstein, first published under the title Der Aufbau des Organismus: Einführung in die Biologie unter besonderer Berücksichtigung der Erfahrungen am kranken Menschen, in 1934.

A new edition of the English translation was published in 1995: The Organism: A Holistic Approach to Biology Derived from Pathological Data in Man, with a foreword by Oliver Sacks, New York, Zone Books. After the rise of Hitler, Goldstein escaped to Amsterdam, supported by The Rockefeller Foundation, where he dictated his work, which would become his magnum opus, in just six weeks. Goldstein described the work being written while in a "time of enforced leisure" in the Netherlands during his flight from Nazi Germany, it was published with only minor revisions in English translation in 1939.

Goldstein's work helped institute the field of phenomenological psychiatry. In The Organism, Goldstein declared that human life cannot be compared to a system which simply returns to a state of balance after stimulation from outside. Goldstein, after critiquing different attempts to classify the instincts, writes that all instinctual manifestations emerge from "the drive to self-actualization." At any moment the organism has the fundamental tendency to actualize all its capacities, its whole potential, as it is present in exactly that moment, and in exactly that situation in contact with the world under the given circumstances. In fact, the term "self-actualization" was originally introduced by Kurt Goldstein as a biological concept to indicate the tendency of the organism's innate motivation to actualize as much as possible which was subsequently extended. Goldstein also referred to the same drive as an "actualizing tendency" and a "formative tendency."

In The Organism Goldstein's main concern was to apply the figure-ground principle of gestalt psychology from perception to the whole organism, presuming that the whole organism serves as the ground for the individual stimulus forming the figure - thus formulating an early criticism of the simple behavioristic stimulus-response-theory.

Goldstein pointed out the experience of individuals with lesioned brains makes it obvious that our neurological and neuropsychological functioning is socially intertwined with that of other brains. Goldstein described preferred behavior (in contrast to non-preferred behavior) as the realization of a reduced subset of all possible performances available to oneself (whether in motility, perception, posture, etc.) that are characterized by a feeling of comfort and correctness.

In his work, Goldstein claimed that specific colors elicit specific emotional responses. Subsequently, clinicians have asserted that children's use of color in art, for example, is a manifestation of their underlying emotional status.

In his foreword to the English edition, 1995, Oliver Sacks writes (p. 9):

"But from the start, the physician in him found the classical methods—delineating a number of isolated "deficits"—inadequate. Whatever particular deficits there might he, he felt, there was always a general reaction or change in the individual as well, sometimes farther-reaching than the deficit itself. There grew on him the sense of the patient reacting as a whole, as an organism, developing altered orientations and behaviors in response to injury or illness. This sense came to a crisis during World War I, when he was confronted with the task of treating a great number of young soldiers with brain injuries. The very complex pictures he was to see in these patients led him to formulate an ever more elaborate corpus of theoretical concepts: abstract versus concrete behavior, "catastrophic" reactions to brain injury, and so on."

Sacks goes on (p. 11):

"The notion of order is central to Goldstein's ideas of health and disease and those of rehabilitation: "Thus, being well means to be capable of ordered behavior which may prevail in spite of the impossibility of certain performances which were formerly possible. But the new state of health is not the same as the old one ... Recovery is a newly achieved state of ordered functioning ... .a new individual norm." Thus, in contradiction to a classical, "splitting" neurology, Goldstein sees symptoms not as isolated expressions of local damage in the nervous system but as "attempted solutions" the organism has arrived at, once it has been altered by disease. "Symptoms," for Goldstein, betoken whole levels of organization, adaptation to an altered inner state (and world). It is impossible, he emphasizes, to consider any illness—but above all, a neurological illness—without reference to the patient's self, and the forms of his adaptation and orientation within it. Disease, for Goldstein, involves a "shrinkage" (or, at the least, a "revision") of self and world, until an equilibrium of a radically new sort can be achieved."

== Contents (English edition, 1995) ==
Foreword by Oliver Sacks 7

Preface to the German Edition 15

Author's Preface 17

Introduction 23

I A Method of Determining Symptoms. Certain General Laws of Organismic Life. Observations on Persons with Brain Injuries 33

II The Organism Viewed in the Light of Results Obtained Through Atomistic Method. The Theory of Reflex Structure of the Organism 69

III Theoretical Reflections on the Function of the Nervous System as Foundation for a Theory of the Organism 95

IV Modification of Function Due to Impairment of the Organism 115

V The Nature of Partitive Processes 133

VI On the Conception of the Organism as a Whole 173

VII Certain Essential Characteristics of the Organism in the Light of the Holistic Approach 229

VIII On Gestalt Psychology and the Theory of the Physical Gestalten 285

IX The Nature of Biological Knowledge 305

X On Norm, Health, and Disease. On Anomaly, Heredity, and Breeding 325

XI On Life and Mind. The Problem of Organismic Hierarchy 353

XII Knowledge and Action 377

XIII Concluding Remarks 383

Notes 395

Index 413
