= Person-centered therapy =

Form of psychotherapy developed by psychologist Carl Rogers

- MeSH: D009629

Person-centered therapy (PCT) (Note: Also known as person-centered psychotherapy, person-centered counseling, client-centered therapy and Rogerian psychotherapy.) is a humanistic approach to psychotherapy developed by psychologist Carl Rogers and colleagues beginning in the 1940s and extending into the 1980s. Person-centered therapy emphasizes the importance of creating a therapeutic environment grounded in three core conditions: unconditional positive regard (acceptance), congruence (genuineness), and empathic understanding. It seeks to facilitate a client's actualizing tendency, "an inbuilt proclivity toward growth and fulfillment", via acceptance (unconditional positive regard), therapist congruence (genuineness), and empathic understanding.

== History and influences ==
Person-centered therapy was developed by Carl Rogers in the 1940s and 1950s, and was brought to public awareness largely through his book Client-centered Therapy, published in 1951. It has been recognized as one of the major types of psychotherapy (theoretical orientations), along with psychodynamic psychotherapy, psychoanalysis, classical Adlerian psychology, cognitive behavioral therapy, existential therapy, and others. Its underlying theory arose from the results of empirical research; it was the first theory of therapy to be driven by empirical research, with Rogers at pains to reassure other theorists that "the facts are always friendly". Originally called non-directive therapy, it "offered a viable, coherent alternative to Freudian psychotherapy. ... [Rogers] redefined the therapeutic relationship to be different from the Freudian authoritarian pairing."

Person-centered therapy is often described as a humanistic therapy, but its main principles appear to have been established before those of humanistic psychology. Some have argued that "it does not in fact have much in common with the other established humanistic therapies" but, by the mid-1960s, Rogers accepted being categorized with other humanistic (or phenomenological-existential) psychologists in contrast to behavioral and psychoanalytic psychologists. Despite the importance of the self to person-centered theory, the theory is fundamentally organismic and holistic in nature, with the individual's unique self-concept at the center of the unique "sum total of the biochemical, physiological, perceptual, cognitive, emotional and interpersonal behavioural subsystems constituting the person".

Rogers coined the term counselling in the 1940s because, at that time, psychologists were not legally permitted to provide psychotherapy in the US. Only medical practitioners were allowed to use the term psychotherapy to describe their work.

Rogers affirmed individual personal experience as the basis and standard for living and therapeutic effect. This emphasis contrasts with the dispassionate position which may be intended in other therapies, particularly the behavioral therapies. Hallmarks of Rogers's person-centered therapy include: living in the present rather than the past or future; organismic trust; naturalistic faith in one's own thoughts and the accuracy in one's feelings; a responsible acknowledgment of one's freedom; and a view toward participating fully in our world and contributing to other peoples' lives. Rogers also claimed that the therapeutic process is, in essence, composed of the accomplishments made by the client. The client, having already progressed further along in their growth and maturation development, only progresses further with the aid of a psychologically favored environment.

== The necessary and sufficient conditions ==
Rogers (1957; 1959) stated that there are six necessary and sufficient conditions required for therapeutic change:

1. Therapist–client psychological contact: A relationship between client and therapist must exist, and it must be a relationship in which each person's perception of the other is important.
2. Client incongruence: Incongruence (as defined by Carl Rogers; "a lack of alignment between the real self and the ideal self") exists between the client's experience and awareness.
3. Therapist congruence, or genuineness: The therapist is congruent within the therapeutic relationship; the therapist is deeply involved—they are not "acting"—and they can draw on their own experiences (self-disclosure) to facilitate the relationship.
4. Therapist unconditional positive regard: The therapist accepts the client unconditionally, without judgment, disapproval, or approval. This facilitates increased self-regard in the client, as they can begin to become aware of experiences in which their view of self-worth was distorted or denied.
5. Therapist empathic understanding: The therapist experiences an empathic understanding of the client's internal frame of reference. Accurate empathy on the part of the therapist helps the client believe the therapist's unconditional regard for them.
6. Client perception: The client perceives, to at least a minimal degree, the therapist's unconditional positive regard and empathic understanding.

The three conditions specific to the therapist/counselor came to be called the core conditions of PCT: therapist congruence, unconditional positive regard or acceptance, and accurate empathic understanding. There is a large body of publications of empirical research on these conditions.

== Processes ==
Rogers believed that a therapist who embodies the three critical and reflexive attitudes (the three core conditions) will help liberate their client to more confidently express their true feelings without fear of judgement. To achieve this, the client-centered therapist carefully avoids directly challenging their client's way of communicating themselves in the session in order to enable a deeper exploration of the issues most intimate to them and free from external referencing. Rogers was not prescriptive in telling his clients what to do, but believed that the answers to the clients' questions were within the client and not the therapist. Accordingly, the therapist's role was to create a facilitative, empathic environment wherein the client could discover the answers for themselves.

Recent studies suggest that narrative shifts within therapy, such as "innovative moments" where clients express thoughts or behaviors inconsistent with their previous problematic self-narratives, are associated with meaningful psychological change in client-centered therapy. Additionally, a study found that person-centered and experiential therapies were effective in treating anxiety, particularly when emotional depth and self-exploration were central to the process. However, these therapies were sometimes less effective than cognitive-behavioral therapy in direct comparisons, which supports the importance of tailoring treatment to individual client needs.

Building on this, another study used a machine learning approach to determine which clients would respond better to person-centered therapy versus cognitive-behavioral therapy. Their findings showed that outcomes significantly improved when therapy was matched to the client’s predicted needs, reinforcing the value of personalized care.

== Effectiveness ==
Research on the effectiveness of person-centered therapy (PCT) across various clinical conditions has produced mixed but encouraging results. While PCT has generally been found to yield positive outcomes for anxiety and depression, some studies suggest it may be less effective than structured approaches like cognitive-behavioral therapy (CBT) in certain contexts. For example, a 2013 meta-analysis found that experiential therapies, including PCT, showed improvement in clients with anxiety from pre- to post-treatment, although they often performed below CBT in direct comparisons.

Even so, PCT offers distinct advantages. Its focus on emotional depth, client autonomy, and a non-directive therapeutic environment can be particularly helpful for individuals who prefer a more supportive and less structured approach to therapy. These qualities may also make PCT a good fit for clients who have had negative experiences with more prescriptive or diagnosis-driven models.

Recent findings suggest that outcomes improve when therapy is matched to individual client needs. Delgadillo and Duhne used machine learning to analyze which clients responded best to CBT versus PCT. Their results showed that clients who received the therapy most aligned with their predicted treatment response experienced significantly better outcomes than those who received a non-matching therapy. This supports the idea that while PCT may not be ideal for every individual, it can be highly effective when personalized to the client.

== Applications ==
Person-centered therapy has been adapted for a variety of populations and settings. For example, a randomized controlled trial in Portugal demonstrated that PCT significantly improved self-esteem in older adults by reducing the gap between their real and ideal selves. These improvements were maintained at a 12-month follow-up, suggesting long-term effectiveness in aging populations.

PCT has also been applied in educational and youth counseling settings. Its emphasis on empathy, acceptance, and authentic communication makes it particularly effective for adolescents and young adults who are navigating identity development, interpersonal challenges, and emotional regulation. Additionally, the non-directive nature of PCT allows it to be used across cultural contexts where traditional therapist-led approaches may not align with community values or client expectations.

The adaptability of person-centered therapy stems from its core belief that the client is the expert in their own experience. This principle enables therapists to work effectively with diverse populations while maintaining a strong respect for individual autonomy and cultural differences.

== Criticism and limitations ==
Although client-centered therapy has been criticized by behaviorists for lacking structure and by psychoanalysts for offering what they view as a conditional rather than truly neutral therapeutic relationship, research has shown that person-centered therapy can be effective across a variety of clinical issues. Critics have also noted that the non-directive nature of PCT can make it difficult to measure outcomes consistently, as well as to assess the uniform application of its core conditions across therapists.

Another concern involves the generalizability and adaptability of the approach. A study by Delgadillo and Duhne used machine learning to examine whether certain clients with depression responded better to person-centered counseling or cognitive-behavioral therapy. The results showed that clients who received the therapy most closely aligned with their predicted treatment response experienced significantly better outcomes than those who received a non-matching therapy. This supports the idea that while PCT can be highly effective, it may not be the best choice for every individual unless selected based on specific client needs.

In addition, some have questioned whether PCT provides sufficient structure for clients with more severe or complex mental health conditions, such as trauma or chronic depression. Although PCT encourages emotional growth within a supportive relationship, it may require adaptation or integration with other therapeutic models to effectively meet the needs of clients dealing with more intensive clinical presentations.

== See also ==
- Humanistic psychology
- Human Potential Movement
- ELIZA

== Bibliography ==
- Arnold, Kyle (2014). "Behind the mirror: reflective listening and its tain in the work of Carl Rogers". The Humanistic Psychologist. 42 (4): 354–369. doi:10.1080/08873267.2014.913247.
- Bruno, Frank Joe (1977). "Client-centered counseling: becoming a person". Human adjustment and personal growth: seven pathways. New York: John Wiley & Sons. pp. 362–370. ISBN 9780471114352. OCLC 2614322.
- Cooper, Mick; O'Hara, Maureen; Schmid, Peter F.; Wyatt, Gill, eds. (2013) [2007]. The handbook of person-centred psychotherapy and counselling (2nd ed.). New York: Palgrave Macmillan. ISBN 9780230280496. OCLC 937523949.
- Rogers, Carl R. (1951). Client-centered therapy, its current practice, implications, and theory. The Houghton Mifflin psychological series. Boston: Houghton Mifflin. OCLC 2571303.
- Rogers, Carl R. (1957). "The necessary and sufficient conditions of therapeutic personality change". Journal of Consulting Psychology. 21 (2): 95–103. CiteSeerX 10.1.1.605.9768. doi:10.1037/h0045357. PMID 13416422.
- Rogers, Carl R. (1959). "A theory of therapy, personality and interpersonal relationships as developed in the client-centered framework". In Koch, Sigmund (ed.). Psychology: a study of a science. Vol. 3: Formulations of the person and the social context. New York: McGraw Hill. pp. 184-256. OCLC 3731949.
- Rogers, Carl R. (1961). On becoming a person: a therapist's view of psychotherapy. Boston: Houghton Mifflin. ISBN 9780395081341. OCLC 172718.
- Rogers, Carl R. (1980). A way of being. Boston: Houghton Mifflin. ISBN 9780395299159. OCLC 6602382.
- Rogers, Carl R.; Lyon, Harold C.; Tausch, Reinhard (2013). On becoming an effective teacher: person-centered teaching, psychology, philosophy, and dialogues with Carl R. Rogers and Harold Lyon. London; New York: Routledge. ISBN 9780415816977. OCLC 820119514.
- Ruggero, Camilo J.; et al. (2019). "Integrating the Hierarchical Taxonomy of Psychopathology (HiTOP) into clinical practice". Journal of Consulting and Clinical Psychology. 87 (12): 1069–1084. doi:10.1037/ccp0000452. PMC 6859953. PMID 31724426.
- Elliott, Robert (2013). "Person-centered/Experiential psychotherapy for anxiety difficulties: Theory, research and practice". Person-Centered & Experiential Psychotherapies. 12: 16–32. doi:10.1080/14779757.2013.767750.
- Gullestad, Frida Slagstad; Wilberg, Theresa; Klungsøyr, Ole; Johansen, Merete Selsbakk; Urnes, Øyvind; Karterud, Sigmund (2012). "Is treatment in a day hospital step-down program superior to outpatient individual psychotherapy for patients with personality disorders? 36 months follow-up of a randomized clinical trial comparing different treatment modalities". Psychotherapy Research. 22 (4): 426–441. doi:10.1080/10503307.2012.662608. PMID 22417131.
- Potter, Carrie M.; Drabick, Deborah A.G.; Heimberg, Richard G. (2014). "Panic symptom profiles in social anxiety disorder: A person-centered data-analytic approach". Behaviour Research and Therapy. 56: 53–59. doi:10.1016/j.brat.2014.03.004. PMID 24685535.
