= Robert Desoille =

French psychotherapist (1890 – 1966)

Robert Desoille (May 29, 1890 - October 10, 1966) was a French psychotherapist. A graduate of the Sorbonne and École centrale de Lille, he worked at EDF and he became known for his studies on waking dreams.

Desoille was born in Besançon into a family of military officers and began a scientific education in engineering that he would never complete after being mobilized in World War I. After his 1923 meeting with Colonel Eugène Caslant, who introduced him to an experimental mental imaging technique, he developed his method of the "directed waking dream" (rêve eveillé dirigé, or RED), explicating it in seven books.

== RED protocol ==
Lying on his back, the subject puts himself into a state of relaxation and closes his eyes in order to create an imaginary scenario in which he is the principal (or sole) hero. Placing himself behind the subject, the therapist sometimes intervenes to specify part of imaginary space or a possible bifurcation of the scenario. In another phase of the therapeutic work, the subject writes a written report which will be used in a face-to-face session in order to explore the meaning of the scenario. For children, the protocol is modified: with his eyes open, the child sits at a table and draws a comic strip of the scenario he imagines.

== Influences and legacy ==
At the theoretical level, Desoille was influenced by first by Sigmund Freud, then by Carl Gustav Jung and finally, following his membership of the French Communist Party, he constrained himself to a Pavlovian theorization.

Desoille's first writings in the 1930s built on the work of Freud, Pierre Janet, and Roland Dalbiez. He studied the relationship between symbolism, invention, and memory in his early works, underscoring the applicability of the directed waking dream method in exploring sublimation. In the 1940s, Desoille referenced Jung's collective unconscious and presented his own conception of the mind based on Freud's three instances. The transference identified by Freud, Desoille believed, could be expressed and resolved in the directed waking dream. Finally in the 1950s and 1960s, concomitant to his political affiliations, Desoille held to a Pavlovian conception of neurosis, based on reflexes, in what was termed a "rational psychotherapy". Those reflexes that are poorly adapted could be dissolved through the directed waking dream method, according to Desoille, and, starting in the imagination, new dynamic stereotypes could be formed. Desoille died at age 76 in Paris.

Desoille's pupils now define themselves as "analysts" and interpret their practice along Freudian, Freudo-Lacanian, or Jungian lines. Authors that cite Desoille's work include Charles Baudouin, Gaston Bachelard, Juliette Favez-Boutonier, Françoise Dolto, Daniel Lagache and Roberto Assagioli; parallels have also been drawn between Desoille's work and that of Milton H. Erickson and neuro-linguistic programming. Desoille's work was used in the development of guided imagery techniques used in psychosynthesis.

== Selected works ==
- Exploration de l'affectivité subconsciente par la méthode du rêve-éveillé: sublimation et acquisitions psychologiques [Exploration of Subconscious Affectivity Using the Waking Dream Method: Sublimation and Psychological Findings] (1938)
- Le rêve-éveillé en psychothérapie: essai sur la fonction de régulation de l'inconscient collectif [The Waking Dream in Psychotherapy: Essay on the Function and Regulation of the Collective Unconscious] (1945)
- Théorie et pratique du rêve-éveillé dirigé [Theory and Practice of the Directed Waking Dream] (1961)

== Biography ==
- Bioy, Antoine; Célestin-Lhopiteau, Isabelle (26 February 2014). Aide-mémoire - Hypnothérapie et hypnose médicale: en 57 notions. Paris: Dunod. ISBN 9782100597321.
