= ERG theory =

Theory which further expands and explains "Maslow's hierarchy of needs"

The ERG theory is a theory of human need proposed by Clayton Alderfer, which built upon Maslow's hierarchy of needs by categorizing needs relating to existence, relatedness and growth.

== Overview ==
ERG theory. When needs in a category are satisfied, an individual will invest more efforts in the higher category. When needs in a category are frustrated, an individual will invest more efforts in the lower category.

In 1969, psychologist Clayton Alderfer built upon Abraham Maslow's hierarchy of needs by categorizing the hierarchy into his ERG theory (Existence, Relatedness and Growth). The existence category is concerned with the need for providing the basic material existence requirements of humans. The relatedness category is concerned with the desire for maintaining important interpersonal relationships. The growth category is concerned with the desire for personal development. These include the intrinsic component from Maslow's esteem category and the characteristics included under self-actualization.

Alderfer categorized Maslow's physiological needs and Maslow's safety needs into the existence category, Maslow's social needs and Maslow's extrinsic component of self-esteem needs into the relatedness category, and Maslow's intrinsic component of self-esteem needs and Maslow's self-actualization needs into the growth category. Alderfer also proposed a progression and regression theory to go along with the ERG theory: he said that when needs in a lower category are satisfied, an individual will invest more effort in the higher category, and when needs in a higher category are frustrated, an individual will invest more efforts in the lower category. For example, if self-esteem or self-actualization is not met then an individual will invest more effort in the relatedness category in the hopes of achieving the higher need.

== Publication ==
This theory was published originally in the journal Organizational Behavior and Human Performance.

== See also ==
- Engel's law, an economic model for how well basic needs are met
- John Curtis Gowan
- Juan Antonio Pérez López, spontaneous and rational motivation
- Manfred Max-Neef's Fundamental human needs
- Maslow's hierarchy of needs
- Metamotivation
- Murray's psychogenic needs
- Need theory
- Need
