= Food Desert Oasis Act of 2009 =

American legislative proposal on food deserts

- Announced in: the 111th United States Congress
- Sponsored by: Bobby Rush
- Number of co-sponsors: 17

Citations
- Public law: [H.R. 3100 H.R. 3100]

Legislative history
- Introduced in the House as H.R. 3100 by Bobby Rush (D–IL) on June 26, 2009; Committee consideration by United States House Committee on Ways and Means and United States House Committee on Agriculture

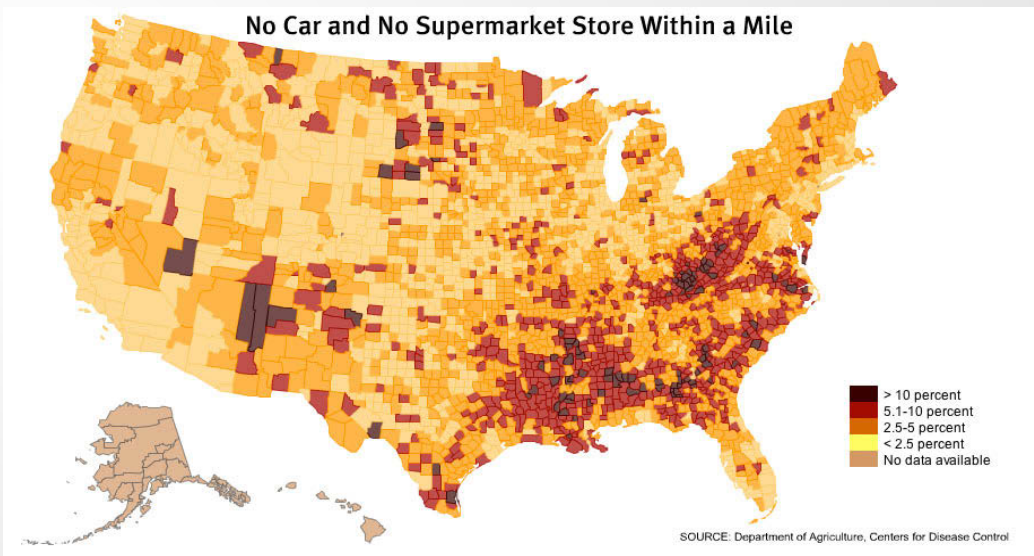
A 2016 USDA map. According to the Medley Food Desert Project, in 2017, nearly 24 million Americans lived in food deserts. Food deserts are heavily concentrated in southern states, which correlates with concentration of poverty, including the south's Black belt. The map shows the percentage of people without cars living in areas with no supermarket within a mile.

The Food Desert Oasis Act of 2009 or H.R. 3100 (111th) was introduced in the US House of Representatives on June 26, 2009 by Rep. Bobby Rush [D-IL 1]. Rep. Rush introduced the bill to establish the Food Desert Oasis Pilot Program, intended to combat food deserts. A food desert defined by the United States Department of Agriculture's Healthy Food Financing Initiative working group, is a "low income census tract where a substantial number or share of residents has low access to a supermarket or large grocery store."

The bill identifies several US cities as food desert zones, defines a qualified food desert business, grants certain tax benefits for those designated food deserts, amends the Food Conservation and Energy Act of 2008 and directs the Secretary of the Treasury to report on the health of such communities. The bill did not come to a vote and did not become law, but other federal initiatives have been created to address food deserts.

== Sections ==
Title I

Section 101 of the Food Desert Oasis Act lists 20 cities as food desert zones. It defines qualified food desert businesses as any wholesale or retail business whose gross sales are at least 25% gained from the sale of fresh fruits and vegetables.

Section 102 of the Food Desert Oasis Act increases the tax credits a qualified food desert business can claim for the rehabilitation of a structure in a food desert.

Section 103 of the Food Desert Oasis Act designates food deserts as empowerment zones for tax purposes, allowing employers at qualified food desert businesses to seek employment tax credits.

Section 104 of the Food Desert Oasis Act determines that states with designated food deserts are eligible for tax exempt bond financing to acquire, construct or rehabilitate commercial property located in a food desert for the use of a qualified food desert business.

Title II

Section 201 amends and expands the Food Conservation and Energy Act of 2008, specifically the section dealing with the Hunger Free Communities Program. The bill would expand the federal government's fiscal responsibility to shoulder 100% of the costs associated with any activity in an identified food desert under the Hunger Free Communities Program in the years 2010 through 2015. The bill amends the time frame of appropriations for the Hunger Free Communities Program from 2012 to 2015.

Title III

Section 301 of the Food Desert Oasis Act instructs the Secretary of the Treasury to report to congress no later than December 31, 2011 and December 31, 2016 on changes in the health of the residents of designated food desert zones. In addition the Secretary of the Treasury must report to congress the effect Title I (sections 101, 102, 103 and 104) on the amount of investments by private business in food desert zones.

== Congressional actions ==
June 26, 2009: Bill Introduced by Rep. Bobby Rush [D-IL1] and 17 Cosponsors

- Carson, Andre [D-IN7]
- Clay, Lacy [D-MO1]
- Cleaver, Emanuel [D-MO5]
- Cohen, Steve [D-IL7]
- Davis, Danny [D-IL7]
- Fudge, Marcia [D-OH11]
- Jackson, Jesse [D-IL2]
- Jackson Lee, Sheila [D-TX18]
- Johnson, Henry "Hank" [D-GA4]
- Kilpatrick, Carolyn [D-MI13]
- Lewis, John [D-GA5]
- Norton, Eleanor [D-DC0]
- Scott, Robert "Bobby"[D-VA3]
- Sestak, Joe [D-PA7] (Joined October 20, 2009)
- Green, Al [D-TX9] (Joined January 12, 2012)
- Schakowdky, Janice "Jan" [D-IL9] Joined March 3, 2010)
- DeGette, Diana [D-CO1] (Joined June 10, 2010)

June 26, 2009: Referred to House Ways and Means Committee and the House Agriculture Committee.

June 18, 2010: Referred to the Subcommittee on Department Operations, Oversight Nutrition and Forestry.

== Related issue areas ==
The provisions in the proposed Food Desert Oasis Act are related to several issue areas, including, but not limited to; Agriculture and Food, Food Assistance and Relief, Fruit and Vegetables, Income Tax Credits, Nutrition and Diet, Poverty and Welfare Assistance, Retail and Wholesale Trades, Securities, Tax Administration and Collection, Taxpayers, Urban and Suburban Affairs and Development.

== Related action by federal agencies ==
To date, the Food Desert Oasis Act has not come to a vote on the house floor. However, the issue of food deserts is being addressed by the Healthy Food Financing Initiative. The Healthy Food Financing Initiative is as a joint effort by the departments of the Treasury, Health and Human Services and Agriculture to prioritize funding in their budgets to support projects aimed at combating food deserts. Funding for these projects come in the form of grants, loans and New Market Tax Credits.

== Influence on urban policy ==
Although the Food Desert Oasis Act did not come to a vote, it did contribute to urban policy and planning. Some cities adopted similar strategies to combat food deserts, including zoning, tax credits, and incentives for business investments for healthy food providers. For example, the Baltimore City Council adopted a proposal in 2015 to reduce property taxes for grocery stores.

== Cities identified as food deserts in the act ==
The Food Desert Oasis Act identifies the cities listed below as food desert. This list is far from exhaustive and includes only urban areas. A closer look at the USDA's Food Desert Locator map shows a large number of food deserts exist in rural areas.

- Chicago, Illinois
- Detroit, Michigan
- Cleveland, Ohio
- Milwaukee, Wisconsin
- Houston, Texas
- Memphis, Tennessee
- Birmingham, Alabama
- San Antonio, Texas
- Kansas City, Missouri
- Indianapolis, Indiana
- Baltimore, Maryland
- Atlanta, Georgia
- Richmond, Virginia
- Los Angeles, California
- Cincinnati, Ohio
- St. Louis, Missouri
- Nashville, Tennessee
- District of Columbia
- Philadelphia, Pennsylvania
- New Orleans, Louisiana

== See also ==
- Food deserts in the United States
