= Maslow's hierarchy of needs =

Theory of developmental psychology

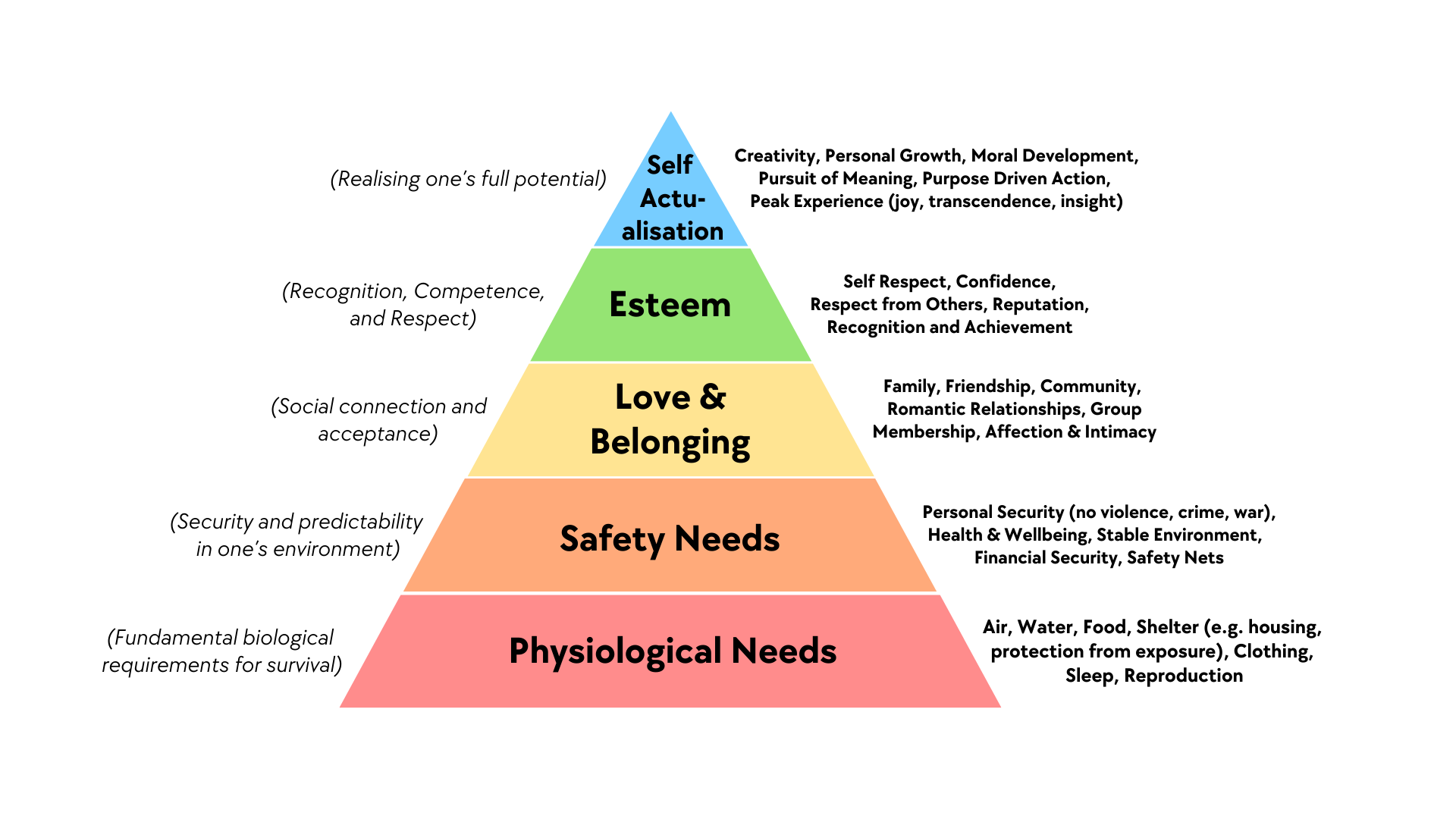
Diagram of Maslow's Hierarchy of Needs (five-level model). Based on his original 1943 paper "A Theory of Human Motivation" and later clarifications.

Maslow's hierarchy of needs is a conceptualization of the needs (or goals) that motivate human behaviour, which was proposed in 1943 by the American psychologist Abraham Maslow.

According to Maslow's original formulation, there are five sets of basic needs that are related to each other in a hierarchy of prepotency (or strength). Typically, the hierarchy is depicted in the form of a pyramid although Maslow himself was not responsible for the iconic diagram. The pyramid begins at the bottom with physiological needs (the most prepotent of all) and culminates at the top with self-actualization needs. In his later writings, Maslow added a sixth level of "meta-needs" and metamotivation.

The hierarchy of needs developed by Abraham Maslow is one of his most enduring contributions to psychology. The hierarchy of needs remains a popular framework and tool in higher education, business and management training, sociology research, healthcare, counselling and social work. Although widely used and researched, the hierarchy of needs has been criticized for its lack of conclusive supporting evidence and its validity remains contested.

== Historical development ==
Maslow proposed his hierarchy of needs in his 1943 paper "A Theory of Human Motivation" in the journal Psychological Review. The theory is a classification system intended to reflect the universal needs of society as its base, then proceeding to more acquired emotions. The hierarchy is split between deficiency needs and growth needs, with two key themes involved within the theory being individualism and the prioritization of needs.

According to Maslow's original formulation, there are five sets of basic needs: physiological, safety, love, esteem and self-actualization. These needs are related to each other in a hierarchy of prepotency (or strength) beginning with the physiological needs that are the most prepotent of all. If the physiological needs are fulfilled, a new set of safety needs emerges. If both the physiological and safety needs are fairly well gratified, the prepotent (‘higher’) need of love (both its giving and receiving) then emerges. The next need is esteem, and finally self-actualization. Maslow also coined the term "metamotivation" to describe the motivation of people who go beyond the scope of basic needs and strive for constant betterment.

The hierarchy suggests a rigid separation of needs, but Maslow stressed that a need does not require being satisfied 100% before the next need emerges. Instead, "a more realistic description of the hierarchy would be in terms of decreasing percentages of satisfaction as we go up the hierarchy of prepotency".

=== Pyramid ===
Maslow's hierarchy of needs is often portrayed in the shape of a pyramid, with the largest, most fundamental needs at the bottom, and the need for self-actualization and transcendence at the top. However, Maslow himself never created a pyramid to represent the hierarchy of needs. The first depiction of the iconic pyramid was due to Charles McDermid, an American consulting psychologist. In an article in the journal Business Horizons, McDermid asserts that Maslow’s theory of motivation provides better insight (than classic economic theory) into the dynamics underlying human behaviour. More specifically, he states, "the hierarchy of needs is arranged in a pyramid of five levels, from basic physiological drives at the bottom to the desire for self-realisation, the highest expression of the human spirit, at the apex".

The most fundamental four layers of the pyramid contain what Maslow called "deficiency needs" or "d-needs": esteem, friendship and love, security, and physical needs. If these "deficiency needs" are not met – except for the most fundamental (physiological) need – there may not be a physical indication, but the individual will feel anxious and tense. Deprivation is what causes deficiency, so when one has unmet needs, this motivates them to fulfill what they are being denied.

The human brain is a complex system and has parallel processes running at the same time, thus many different motivations from various levels of Maslow's hierarchy can occur at the same time. Maslow spoke clearly about these levels and their satisfaction in terms such as "relative", "general", and "primarily". Instead of stating that the individual focuses on a certain need at any given time, Maslow stated that a certain need "dominates" the human organism. Thus Maslow acknowledged the likelihood that the different levels of motivation could occur at any time in the human mind, but he focused on identifying the basic types of motivation and the order in which they would tend to be met. In addition to his anthropological studies, Maslow drew on animal data that "studied and observed monkeys [...] noticing their unusual pattern of behavior that addressed priorities based on individual needs".

=== Alternative illustrations of hierarchy ===
Alternative illustration of hierarchy of needs with overlapping needs

In contrast to the well-known pyramid, a number of alternative schematic illustrations of the hierarchy of needs have been developed. One of the earliest, in 1962, shows a more dynamic hierarchy in terms of 'waves' of different needs overlapping at the same time. As illustrated, the peak of an earlier main set of needs must be passed before the next 'higher' need can begin to assume a dominant role.

Other schematic illustrations of the hierarchy use overlapping triangles to depict the interaction of the different needs. One such updated hierarchy proposes that self-actualization is removed from its privileged place atop the pyramid because it is largely subsumed within status (esteem) and mating-related motives in the new framework.

== Needs ==
=== Physiological needs ===
Physiological needs are the base of the hierarchy. These needs are the biological component for human survival. According to Maslow's hierarchy of needs, physiological needs are factored into internal motivation. According to Maslow's theory, humans are compelled to satisfy physiological needs first to pursue higher levels of intrinsic satisfaction. To advance to higher-level needs in Maslow's hierarchy, physiological needs must be met first. This means that if a person is struggling to meet their physiological needs, they are unwilling to seek safety, belonging, esteem, and self-actualization on their own.

Physiological needs include: air, water, food, heat, clothes, reproduction, shelter and sleep. Many of these physiological needs must be met for the human body to remain in homeostasis. Air, for example, is a physiological need; a human being requires air more urgently than higher-level needs, such as a sense of social belonging. Physiological needs are critical to "meet the very basic essentials of life". This allows for cravings such as hunger and thirst to be satisfied and not disrupt the regulation of the body.

=== Safety needs ===
Once a person's physiological needs are satisfied, their safety needs take precedence and dominate behavior. In the absence of physical safety – due to war, natural disaster, family violence, childhood abuse, etc. and/or in the absence of economic safety – (due to an economic crisis and lack of work opportunities) these safety needs manifest themselves in ways such as a preference for job security, grievance procedures for protecting the individual from unilateral authority, savings accounts, insurance policies, disability accommodations, etc. This level is more likely to predominate in children as they generally have a greater need to feel safe – especially children who have disabilities. Adults are also impacted by this, typically in economic matters; "adults are not immune to the need of safety". It includes shelter, job security, health, and safe environments. If a person does not feel safe in an environment, they will seek safety before attempting to meet any higher level of survival. This is why the "goal of consistently meeting the need for safety is to have stability in one's life", stability brings back the concept of homeostasis for humans which our bodies need.

Safety needs include:

- Health
- Personal security
- Emotional security
- Financial security

=== Love and social needs ===
After physiological and safety needs are fulfilled, the third level of human needs is interpersonal and involves feelings of belongingness. According to Maslow, humans possess an effective need for a sense of belonging and acceptance among social groups, regardless of whether these groups are large or small; being a part of a group is crucial, regardless if it is work, sports, friends or family. The sense of belongingness is "being comfortable with and connection to others that results from receiving acceptance, respect, and love." For example, some large social groups may include clubs, co-workers, religious groups, professional organizations, sports teams, gangs, or online communities. Some examples of small social connections include family members, intimate partners, mentors, colleagues, and confidants. Humans need to love and be loved – both sexually and non-sexually – by others according to Maslow. Many people become susceptible to loneliness, social anxiety, and clinical depression in the absence of this love or belonging element. This need is especially strong in childhood and it can override the need for safety as witnessed in children who cling to abusive parents. Deficiencies due to hospitalism, neglect, shunning, ostracism, etc. can adversely affect the individual's ability to form and maintain emotionally significant relationships in general.

Mental health can be a huge factor when it comes to an individual's needs and development. When an individual's needs are not met, it can cause depression during adolescence. When an individual grows up in a higher-income family, it is much more likely that they will have a lower rate of depression. This is because all of their basic needs are met. Studies have shown that when a family goes through financial stress for a prolonged time, depression rates are higher, not only because their basic needs are not being met, but because this stress strains the parent-child relationship. The parent(s) is stressed about providing for their children, and they are also likely to spend less time at home because they are working more to make more money and provide for their family.

Social belonging needs include:

- Family
- Friendship
- Intimacy
- Trust
- Acceptance
- Receiving and giving love and affection

In certain situations, the need for belonging may overcome the physiological and security needs, depending on the strength of the peer pressure.

=== Esteem needs ===
Esteem is the respect, and admiration of a person, but also "self-respect and respect from others". Most people need stable esteem, meaning that which is soundly based on real capacity or achievement. Maslow noted two versions of esteem needs. The "lower" version of esteem is the need for respect from others and may include a need for status, recognition, fame, prestige, and attention. The "higher" version of esteem is the need for self-respect, and can include a need for strength, competence, mastery, self-confidence, independence, and freedom. This "higher" version takes guidelines, the "hierarchies are interrelated rather than sharply separated". This means that esteem and the subsequent levels are not strictly separated; instead, the levels are closely related.

Esteem comes from day-to-day experiences which provide a learning opportunity that allows us to discover ourselves. This is incredibly important for children, which is why giving them "the opportunity to discover they are competent and capable learners" is crucial. To boost this, adults must provide opportunities for children to have successful and positive experiences to give children a greater "sense of self". Adults, especially parents and educators must create and ensure an environment for children that is supportive and provides them with opportunities that "helps children see themselves as respectable, capable individuals". It can also be found that "Maslow indicated that the need for respect or reputation is most important for children ... and precedes real self-esteem or dignity", which reflects the two aspects of esteem: for oneself and others.

=== Cognitive needs ===
It has been suggested that Maslow's hierarchy of needs can be extended after esteem needs into two more categories: cognitive needs and aesthetic needs. Cognitive needs crave meaning, information, comprehension and curiosity – this creates a will to learn and attain knowledge. From an educational viewpoint, Maslow wanted humans to have intrinsic motivation to become educated people. People have cognitive needs such as creativity, foresight, curiosity, and meaning. Individuals who enjoy activities that require deliberation and brainstorming have a greater need for cognition. Individuals who are unmotivated to participate in the activity, on the other hand, have a low demand for cognitive abilities.

=== Aesthetic needs ===
After reaching one's cognitive needs, it would progress to aesthetic needs to beautify one's life. This would consist of having the ability to appreciate the beauty within the world around one's self, on a day-to-day basis. According to Maslow's theories, to progress toward Self-Actualization, humans require beautiful imagery or novel and aesthetically pleasing experiences. Humans must immerse themselves in nature's splendor while paying close attention to their surroundings and observing them in order to extract the world's beauty. One would accomplish this by making their environment pleasant to look at or be around. They might discover personal style choices that they feel represent them and make their environment a place that they fit well into. This higher level of need to connect with nature results in a sense of intimacy with nature and all that is endearing. Aesthetic needs also relate to beautifying oneself. This would consist of improving one's physical appearance to ensure its beauty to balance the rest of the body. This is done by making and finding ways one wants to dress and express oneself through personal beauty and grooming standards and ideas.

=== Self-actualization ===
"What a man can be, he must be." This quotation forms the basis of the perceived need for self-actualization. This level of need refers to the realization of one's full potential. Maslow describes this as the desire to accomplish everything that one can, to become the most that one can be. People may have a strong, particular desire to become an ideal parent, succeed athletically, or create paintings, pictures, or inventions. To understand this level of need, a person must not only succeed in the previous needs but master them. Self-actualization can be described as a value-based system when discussing its role in motivation. Self-actualization is understood as the goal or explicit motive, and the previous stages in Maslow's hierarchy fall in line to become the step-by-step process by which self-actualization is achievable; an explicit motive is the objective of a reward-based system that is used to intrinsically drive the completion of certain values or goals. Individuals who are motivated to pursue this goal seek and understand how their needs, relationships, and sense of self are expressed through their behavior. Self-actualization needs include:

- Partner acquisition
- Parenting
- Utilizing and developing talents and abilities
- Pursuing goals

=== Transcendence needs ===
Maslow later subdivided the triangle's top to include self-transcendence, also known as spiritual needs. Spiritual needs differ from other types of needs in that they can be met on multiple levels. When this need is met, it produces feelings of integrity and raises things to a higher plane of existence. In his later years, Maslow explored a further dimension of motivation, while criticizing his original vision of self-actualization. Maslow explains that by transcending, an individual is able to unify and consolidate the principles and ideas of their upbringing, with the novel ideas presented throughout life. By these later ideas, one finds the fullest realization in giving oneself to something beyond oneself—for example, in altruism or spirituality. He equated this with the desire to reach the infinite. "Transcendence refers to the very highest and most inclusive or holistic levels of human consciousness, behaving and relating, as ends rather than means, to oneself, to significant others, to human beings in general, to other species, to nature, and to the cosmos."

Ultimately, through the Hierarchy of Needs Maslow is demonstrating that spiritual values have naturalistic meaning, that they are not the exclusive possession of organized churches. Rather, that they are well within the jurisdiction of a suitably enlarged science.

== Criticism ==
=== Blackfoot influence ===
Maslow's early (1938) anthropological research included a field trip to the Blackfoot people (Siksika Nation) in southern Alberta, Canada. Based on his observations of their peaceful and cooperative way of life (in contrast to American society), Maslow concluded that human destructiveness and aggression is largely culturally determined and "most probably a secondary, reactive consequence of thwarting of or threat to the basic human needs". However, claims have been made that Maslow had failed to acknowledge the influence of the Blackfoot philosophy in developing the hierarchy of needs.

According to Kaufman, while acknowledging that Maslow learned much from the Blackfoot people, "there is nothing in these writings to suggest he borrowed or stole ideas for his hierarchy of needs". Without wishing to discredit Maslow, Blackfoot elders and scholars have argued that Maslow did not really understand the Blackfoot philosophy. "It is not that Maslow got the hierarchy wrong or upside down, it is rather that he did not understand the circular nature in which all beings in Siksika society are interconnected and integrated. They surround each other and needs are met through these connections".

=== Self-actualizing people ===
Maslow studied people such as Albert Einstein, Jane Addams, Eleanor Roosevelt, and Baruch Spinoza, rather than mentally ill or neurotic people, writing that "the study of crippled, stunted, immature, and unhealthy specimens can yield only a cripple psychology and a cripple philosophy".

=== Ranking ===
==== Global ranking ====
In a 1976 review of Maslow's hierarchy of needs, little evidence was found for the specific ranking of needs that Maslow described or for the existence of a definite hierarchy at all. This refutation was claimed to be supported by the majority of longitudinal data and cross-sectional studies at the time, with the limited support for Maslow's hierarchy criticized due to poor measurement criteria and selection of control groups.

In 1984, the order in which the hierarchy is arranged was criticized as being ethnocentric by Geert Hofstede. In turn, Hofstede's work was criticized by others. Maslow's hierarchy of needs was argued as failing to illustrate and expand upon the difference between the social and intellectual needs of those raised in individualistic societies and those raised in collectivist societies. The needs and drives of those in individualistic societies tend to be more self-centered than those in collectivist societies, focusing on the improvement of the self, with self-actualization being the apex of self-improvement. In collectivist societies, the needs of acceptance and community will outweigh the needs for freedom and individuality.

Criticisms towards the theory have also been expressed on the lack of consideration towards individualism and collectivism in the context of spirituality.

==== Sex ranking ====
The position and value of sex within Maslow's hierarchy have been a source of criticism. Maslow's hierarchy places sex in the physiological needs category, alongside food and breathing. Some critics argue that this placement of sex neglects the emotional, familial, and evolutionary implications of sex within the community, although others point out that this critique could apply to all of the basic needs. However, Maslow himself acknowledged that the satisfaction of sexual desire was likely linked to other social motives as well. Furthermore, it is recognized that physiological needs such as sex and hunger can be related to higher-order motivations.

=== Cultural and individual variations ===
Although recent research appears to validate the existence of universal human needs, as well as shared ordering of the way in which people seek and satisfy needs, the exact hierarchy proposed by Maslow is called into question. The most common criticism is the expectation that different individuals, with similar backgrounds and at similar junctures in their respective lives, when faced with the same situation, would end up taking the same decision. Instead of that, a common observation is that humans are driven by a unique set of motivations, and their behavior cannot be reliably predicted based on the Maslowian principles.

In a 1997 study, exploratory factor analysis (EFA) of a thirteen-item scale showed there were two particularly important levels of needs in the US during the peacetime of 1993 to 1994: survival (physiological and safety) and psychological (love, self-esteem, and self-actualization). In 1991, a retrospective peacetime measure was established and collected during the Persian Gulf War, and US citizens were asked to recall the importance of needs from the previous year. Once again, only two levels of needs were identified; therefore, people have the ability and competence to recall and estimate the importance of needs. For citizens in the Middle East (Egypt and Saudi Arabia), three levels of needs regarding importance and satisfaction surfaced during the 1990 retrospective peacetime. These three levels were completely different from those of US citizens.

Changes regarding the importance and satisfaction of needs from the retrospective peacetime to wartime due to stress varied significantly across cultures (the US vs. the Middle East). For the US citizens, there was only one level of needs, since all needs were considered equally important. With regards to satisfaction of needs during the war, in the US there were three levels: physiological needs, safety needs, and psychological needs (social, self-esteem, and self-actualization). During the war, the satisfaction of physiological needs and safety needs were separated into two independent needs, while during peacetime, they were combined as one. For the people of the Middle East, the satisfaction of needs changed from three levels to two during wartime.

A study of the ordering of needs in Asia found differences between the ordering of lower and higher order needs. For instance, community (related to belongingness and considered a lower order need in Maslow's hierarchy) was found to be the highest order need across Asia, followed closely by self-acceptance and growth.

A 1981 study looked at how Maslow's hierarchy might vary across age groups. A survey asked participants of varying ages to rate a set number of statements from most important to least important. The researchers found that children had higher physical need scores than the other groups, the love need emerged from childhood to young adulthood, the esteem need was highest among the adolescent group, young adults had the highest self-actualization level, and old age had the highest level of security, it was needed across all levels comparably. The authors argued that this suggested Maslow's hierarchy may be limited as a theory for developmental sequence since the sequence of the love need and the self-esteem need should be reversed according to age.

== See also ==
- ERG theory, further expands and explains Maslow's theory
- First World problem reflects on trivial concerns in the context of more pressing needs
- Manfred Max-Neef's Fundamental human needs, Manfred Max-Neef's model
- Functional prerequisites
- Human givens, a theory in psychotherapy that offers descriptions of the nature, needs, and innate attributes of humans
- Need theory, David McClelland's model
- Positive disintegration
- Puruṣārtha - four needs of human life according to Hinduism
- Self-determination theory, Edward L. Deci's and Richard Ryan's model
