= Prerequisite =

Prerequisite or prerequisites may refer to:

- Prerequisite, a necessary condition for something
- Functional prerequisites, basic needs in sociological theory
- Prerequisite Tree in thinking processes
- Required prior courses or "prereqs", in a higher education curriculum
- The Prerequisite, a 2001 demo album by Kanye West

== See also ==
- Make (software)#Rules and Makefile#Rules, prerequisites or dependencies of the target program
