= Impostor syndrome =

Psychological pattern

- Other names: Impostor phenomenon, impostorism

Impostor syndrome, also known as impostor phenomenon, impostorism, or impostor thoughts, is a psychological experience in which a person suffers from feelings of intellectual and/or professional fraudulence. One source defines it as "the subjective experience of perceived self-doubt in one's abilities and accomplishments compared with others, despite evidence to suggest the contrary".

Those who suffer from impostor syndrome often doubt their skills, talents, or accomplishments. They may have a persistent internalized fear of being exposed as frauds. Despite external evidence of their competence, those experiencing this phenomenon do not believe they deserve their success or luck. They may think that they are deceiving others because they feel as if they are not as intelligent as they outwardly portray themselves to be.

Impostor syndrome is not a recognized psychiatric disorder and is not featured in the American Psychiatric Association's Diagnostic and Statistical Manual, Fifth Edition (DSM-5) nor is it listed as a diagnosis in the International Classification of Diseases, Eleventh Revision (ICD-11). Thus, clinicians lack information on the prevalence, comorbidities, and best practices for assessing and treating impostor syndrome. However, outside the academic literature, impostor syndrome has become widely discussed, especially in the context of achievement in the workplace.

== Signs and symptoms ==
Impostor syndrome is studied as a reaction to particular stimuli and events. It is an experience that a person has, not a mental disorder. Impostor syndrome is not recognized in the DSM or ICD, although both of these classification systems recognize low self-esteem and sense of failure as associated symptoms of depression.

Although impostor syndrome is not a pathological condition, it is a distorted system of belief about oneself that can have a powerful negative impact on people's valuation of their own worth.

=== Comorbidity ===
People with impostor syndrome have a higher chance of suffering from depression and anxiety. They are also more likely to experience low self-esteem, somatic symptoms, and social dysfunctions.

A 2025 study conducted by the University of Idaho concluded that "imposterism was strongly positively correlated to the subtypes of rigid and self-critical perfectionism, but showed a null correlation with narcissistic perfectionism. Thus, it appears imposterism and perfectionism are closely related constructs, but there are important distinctions between the subtypes of each."

== Associated factors ==
Impostor syndrome is associated with several factors. Some of them are considered to be risk factors, while others are considered to be consequences. However, since the associations are documented in correlational studies, it is not possible to identify cause and effect.

=== Risk factors ===
Impostor syndrome is associated with neuroticism, low self-esteem and perfectionism. It is negatively correlated with the personality traits of extraversion, agreeableness, and conscientiousness.

Impostor syndrome can stem from and result in strained personal relationships and can hinder people from achieving their full potential in their fields of interest. The term "impostorization" shifts the source of the phenomenon away from the supposed impostor to institutions whose policies, practices, or workplace cultures "either make or intend to make individuals question their intelligence, competence, and sense of belonging."

=== Implications ===
Higher scores on commonly used measures of the impostor phenomenon have been associated with lower job satisfaction and job performance, as well as higher rates of burnout.

== Measurement ==
The first scale designated to measure characteristics of the impostor phenomenon was designed by Harvey in 1981 and included 14 items.

In 1985, the Clance Impostor Phenomenon Scale (CIPS) was developed. This 20-item measure, in contrast to the Harvey Impostor Scale, recognizes the anxiety associated with being judged and the sense of inferiority towards peers. The scale is the most frequently used. However, research has not yet conclusively shown its superiority over other scales.

Other measures include the Perceived Fraudulence Scale (by Kolligian and Sternberg) and the Leary Impostor Scale, a 7-item test that assesses a single facet of the impostor phenomenon: a perception of being an impostor or fraud. In 2023 the Impostor Phenomenon Assessment was developed based on three factors:

- Doubts about achievement – fear of failure/success and overpreparation. For example: "I often feel that I have to work harder than others to achieve all that I do".
- Perceived discrepancy – discounting achievements and attributing success to external factors such as luck. For example: "I feel that I have attained my present academic or professional position through 'pulling strings' or 'having connections'".
- Self-handicapping behaviours – avoidance and perfectionism. For example: "I find myself often leaving tasks to the last minute".

== Conceptual and measurement issues ==
Recent research has questioned whether commonly used measures capture a central feature of the impostor phenomenon, the belief that others perceive one as more competent than one perceives oneself. McElwee and Yurak found that existing impostor scales more closely measured general negative affect than this predicted discrepancy. Tewfik subsequently distinguished this sociocognitive conceptualization from affective and behavioral characteristics, such as fear of being exposed, that have been incorporated into conceptualizations and measures of the impostor phenomenon. She argued that incorporating negative affect into the definition of the phenomenon may contribute to the predominantly negative outcomes reported in the literature and obscure other potential outcomes.

Returning to the sociocognitive conceptualization of the impostor phenomenon, Tewfik termed it workplace impostor thoughts in the work domain, defined as the belief that others overestimate one's competence at work, and developed a five-item measure to assess it. The measure, the Workplace Impostor Thoughts Scale (WITS), was related to but distinct from the Clance Impostor Phenomenon Scale. A 2025 multidisciplinary review identified continuing problems with construct clarity and proposed recentering the belief that others overestimate one's abilities as the defining cognitive feature of the impostor phenomenon.

== Management ==
Psychology professors dealing with impostor syndrome have suggested several recommendations for people in similar situations. These include:

- Trying not to let emotions of worthlessness or uncertainty control one's actions, instead embracing fears and moving forward;
- Considering accomplishments in the past as proof against impostor syndrome, and utilizing them as a fallback when one starts to doubt one's abilities;
- Building a rapport with a counselor who can assist in identifying false ideas that perpetuate impostor syndrome;
- Creating areas where one's identities are honored and expressed, as a reminder of one's belonging;
- Helping others reject impostor beliefs by reflecting to them their values, abilities, and talents. Assisting others may also work as a beneficial reminder for oneself.

=== Psychosocial interventions ===
In 2019, when a systematic review was conducted, none of the 62 studies on impostor syndrome empirically assessed the efficacy of treatment.

In their 1978 paper, Clance and Imes proposed a therapeutic approach they used for their participants or clients with impostor phenomenon. This technique includes a group setting where people meet others who are also living with this experience. The researchers explained that group meetings made a significant impact on their participants. They proposed that this impact was a result of the realization that they were not the only ones who experienced these feelings. The participants were required to complete various homework assignments as well. In one assignment, participants recalled all of the people they believed they had fooled or tricked in the past. In another take-home task, people wrote down the positive feedback they had received. Later, they would have to recall why they received this feedback and what about it made them perceive it in a negative light. In the group sessions, the researchers also had the participants reframe common thoughts and ideas about performance. An example would be to change: "I might fail this exam" to "I will do well on this exam".

The researchers concluded that simply extracting the self-doubt before an event occurs helps eliminate feelings of impostorism. It was recommended that people struggling with this experience seek support from friends and family.

== Epidemiology ==
Impostor syndrome prevalence rates range considerably from 9 to 82%, depending on the screening method and threshold used. Rates are especially high among ethnic minority groups. The syndrome is common among men and women and in people of all ages (from teenagers to late-stage professionals).

Impostor syndrome is common for students who enter a new academic environment. Feelings of insecurity can come as a result of an unknown, new environment. This can lead to lower self-confidence and belief in their own abilities.

=== Gender differences ===
When impostor syndrome was first conceptualised, it was viewed as a phenomenon that was common among high-achieving women. Further research has shown that it affects both men and women; the proportion affected is more or less equally distributed among the genders. People with impostor syndrome often have corresponding mental health issues, which may be treated with psychological interventions, though the phenomenon is not a formal mental disorder.

Clance and Imes stated in their 1978 article that, based on their clinical experience, impostor syndrome was less prevalent in men. However, more recent research has mostly found that impostor syndrome is spread equally among men and women. This association with women was thought to stem from societal pressures, gender biases, and traditional expectations that shaped self-perceptions. While the manifestation of impostor syndrome may vary across genders such as men being less likely to disclose feelings of inadequacy, both genders experience the phenomenon under similar psychological conditions. Studies have also highlighted how cultural and environmental factors may influence how these individuals experience these feelings.

Girls were also more likely to have lower expectations of success than boys, even in a new and different achievement context, though they had actually performed better than boys. Healthy attribution patterns or having a positive way of understanding challenges and successes are particularly beneficial to women in male-dominated or difficult spaces. Further research has also suggested that women may experience higher societal pressure to prove competence in male-dominated fields, potentially amplifying impostor feelings in certain contexts. Additionally, women may experience more gender-based discrimination or harassment especially in male-dominated workplaces which may increase feelings of depression and anxiety. Men, on the other hand, may experience stigma against openly discussing insecurities, which can mask the true prevalence of impostor syndrome among male populations.

=== Settings ===
The impostor phenomenon has been studied in workplace, medical, and academic settings.

==== Workplace ====
Research using the workplace impostor thoughts measure has identified workplace outcomes that differ from the predominantly negative outcomes emphasized in earlier research. Across field and experimental studies, workplace impostor thoughts were associated with a greater other-focused orientation, which in turn was associated with greater interpersonal effectiveness as evaluated by others. These interpersonal effects were not accompanied by reductions in competence-related outcomes such as performance or selection. Later research found that, under conditions of high role overload, employees with more frequent workplace impostor thoughts exerted greater effort, which was associated with better subsequent job performance.

==== Medicine ====
The impostor phenomenon has been studied among physicians and physicians in training, with reported prevalence estimates ranging from 22% to 62%.

==== Academic settings ====
The impostor phenomenon is common among students entering new academic environments and has been associated with concerns about academic preparedness and comparisons with peers. Among ethnic minority college students, impostor feelings have been associated with psychological distress and minority-status stress.

Research on doctoral students has similarly found associations between the impostor phenomenon and psychological and academic factors. A study of clinical and counseling psychology doctoral students found positive associations with perfectionistic cognitions, depression, and anxiety, with 88% of its 84 participants reporting at least moderate impostor phenomenon characteristics. The phenomenon has also been studied among doctoral students more broadly.

== History ==
The term impostor phenomenon was introduced in an article published in 1978, titled "The Impostor Phenomenon in High Achieving Women: Dynamics and Therapeutic Intervention" by Pauline R. Clance and Suzanne A. Imes. Clance and Imes defined impostor phenomenon as "an internal experience of intellectual phoniness". In 1985, Clance published a book on the topic, and the phenomenon became widely known. Initially, Clance identified the syndrome with high-achieving professional women, but later studies found that it is widespread in both men and women and in many professional settings.

== Society and culture ==
Several famous people have reported suffering from impostor syndrome. These include Michelle Obama and Sheryl Sandberg.

== See also ==
- Dunning–Kruger effect – a cognitive bias wherein people of non-average ability (both high and low) inaccurately estimate their own abilities
- Explanatory style – how people typically explain events to themselves
- Fake it till you make it
- Illusory superiority – a cognitive bias whereby people overestimate their own qualities and abilities
- Inner critic – a manifestation of the inner voice which demeans and criticises the person it belongs to
- "Fakin' It" (Simon & Garfunkel song) – 1960s-era pop/rock song on the subject
- Inferiority complex
- Jonah complex – the fear of success which prevents the realisation of one's potential
- Poseur
- Self-handicapping
- Setting oneself up to fail – a psychological phenomenon where someone intentionally attempts to prevent their own success at a given task
- Tall poppy syndrome – aspects of a culture where people of high status are resented for having been viewed as superior to their peers
