= Basic needs =

Aspect of poverty measurement

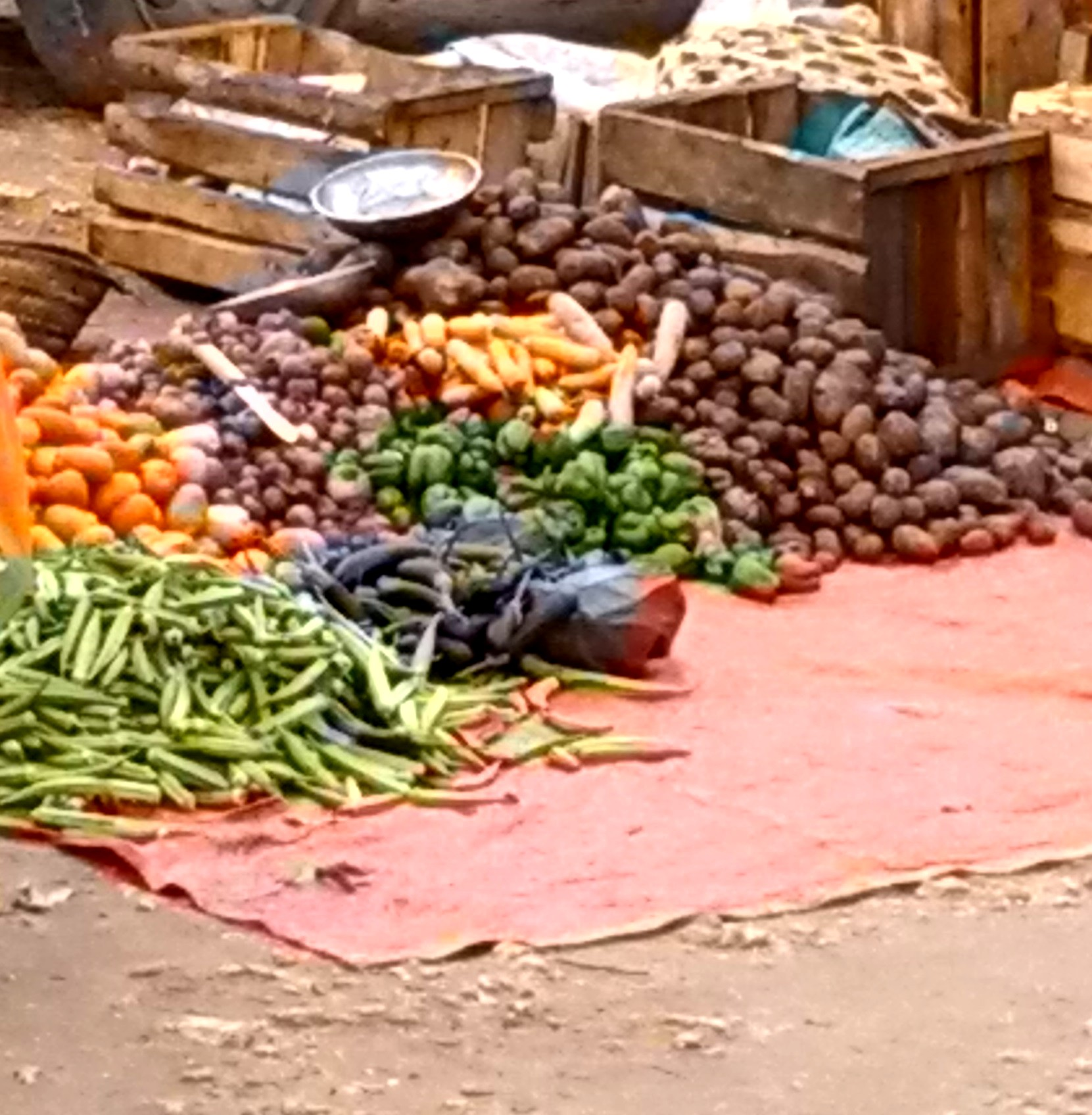
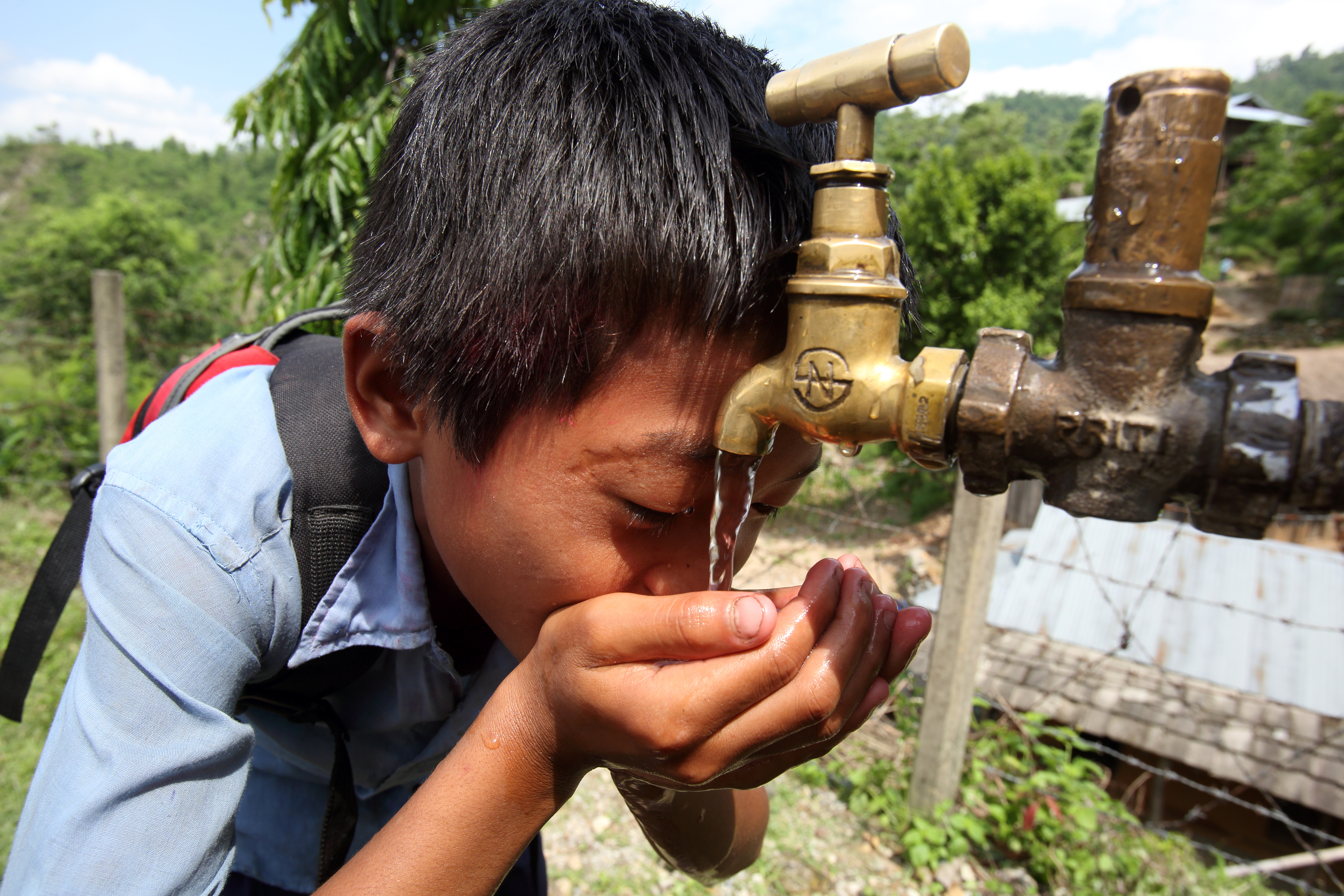
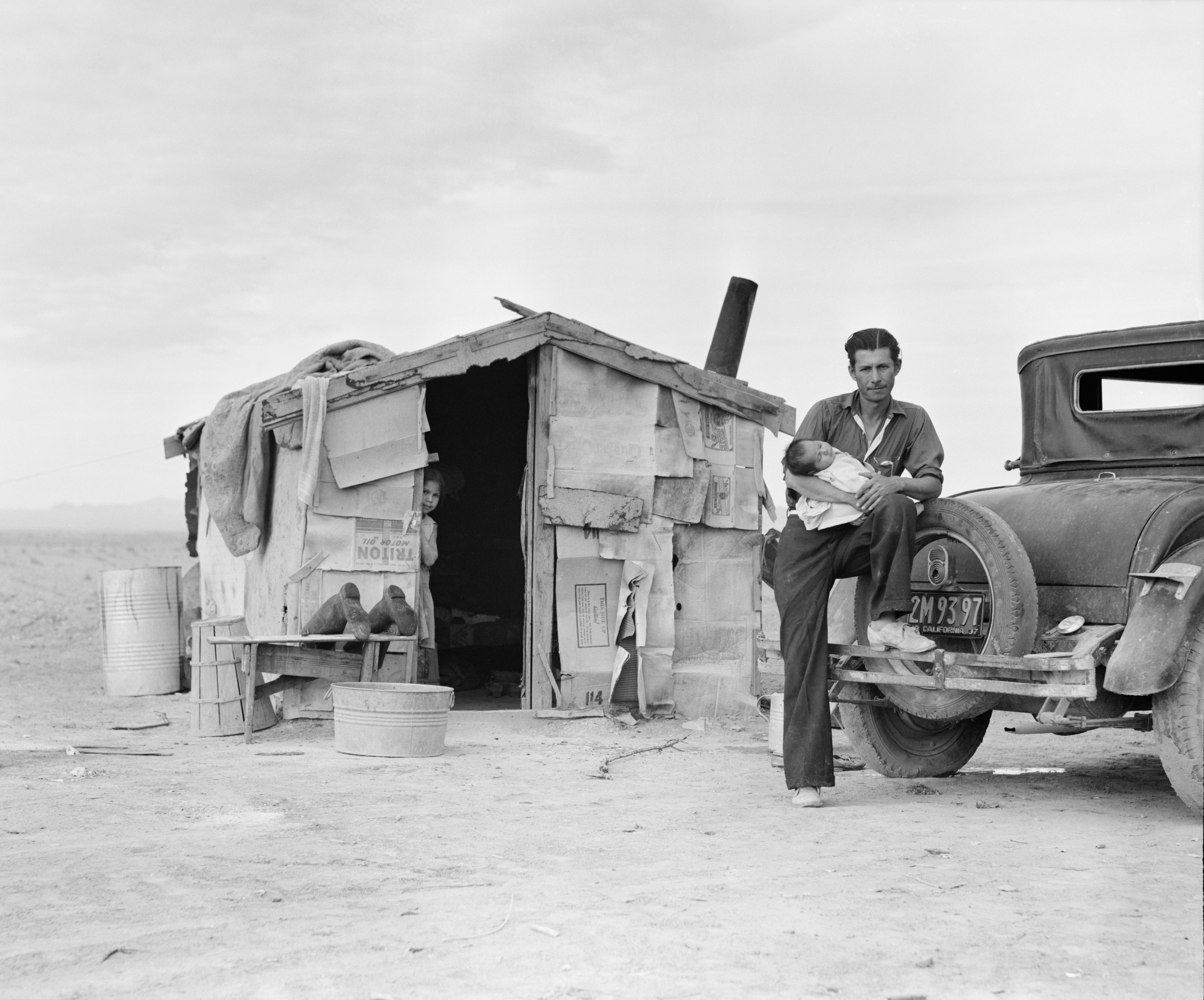
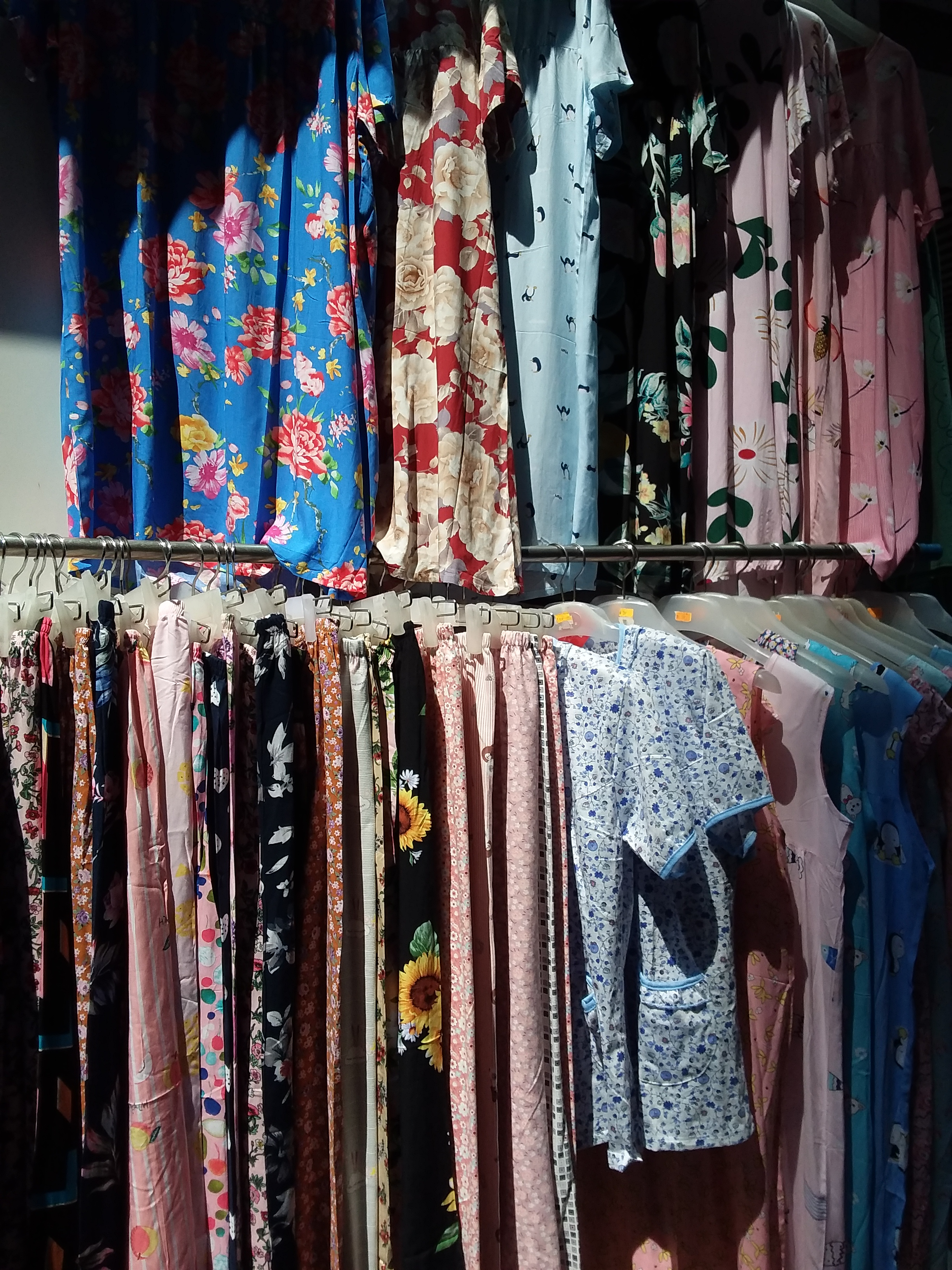
Four of the basic needs are food, water, shelter and clothing

The basic needs approach is one of the major approaches to the measurement of absolute poverty in developing countries globally. It works to define the absolute minimum resources necessary for long-term physical well-being, usually in terms of consumption goods. The poverty line is then defined as the amount of income required to satisfy the needs of the people. The "basic needs" approach was introduced by the International Labour Organization's World Employment Conference in 1976. "Perhaps the high point of the WEP was the World Employment Conference of 1976, which proposed the satisfaction of basic human needs as the overriding objective of national and international development policy. The basic needs approach to development was endorsed by governments and workers' and employers' organizations from all over the world. It influenced the programmes and policies of major multilateral and bilateral development agencies, and was the precursor to the human development approach."

A traditional list of immediate "basic needs" is food (including water), shelter and clothing. Many modern lists also include transportation (as proposed in the Three Principles of the People), sanitation, education, and healthcare. Different agencies use different lists.

The basic needs approach has been described as consumption-oriented, giving the impression "that poverty elimination is all too easy." Amartya Sen focused on 'capabilities' rather than consumption.

In the development discourse, the basic needs model focuses on the measurement of what is believed to be an eradicable level of poverty. Development programs following the basic needs approach do not invest in economically productive activities that will help a society carry its own weight in the future, rather they focus on ensuring each household meets its basic needs even if economic growth must be sacrificed today. These programs focus more on subsistence than fairness. Nevertheless, in terms of "measurement", the basic needs or absolute approach is important. The 1995 world summit on social development in Copenhagen had, as one of its principal declarations that all nations of the world should develop measures of both absolute and relative poverty and should gear national policies to "eradicate absolute poverty by a target date specified by each country in its national context."

== Canada ==
Professor Chris Sarlo, an economist at Nipissing University in North Bay, Ontario, Canada and a senior fellow of the Fraser Institute, uses Statistics Canada's socio-economic databases, particularly the Survey of Household Spending to determine the cost of a list of household necessities. The list includes food, shelter, clothing, health care, personal care, essential furnishings, transportation and communication, laundry, home insurance, and miscellaneous; it assumes that education is provided freely to all residents of Canada. This is calculated for various communities across Canada and adjusted for family size. With this information, he determines the proportion of Canadian households that have insufficient income to afford those necessities. Based on his basic needs poverty threshold, the poverty rate in Canada, the poverty rate has declined from about 12% of Canadian households to about 5% since the 1970s. This is in sharp contrast to the results of Statistic Canada, Conference Board of Canada, the Organisation for Economic Co-operation and Development (OECD) and UNESCO reports using the relative poverty measure considered to the most useful for advanced industrial nations like Canada, which Sarlo rejects. (Note: In 1992 Sarlo argued that the difference between absolute and relative poverty thresholds is artificial since "what is considered to be a necessity depends to some extent on the conditions in the larger society in which one is a member (Sarlo 1992: 19)." In 1992 and again in 2001 Sarlo clarified that the basic needs poverty line is not absolute but relative, since the poverty threshold must be "connected to the society in which people live" but that an "aspect of poverty remains timeless" (Sarlo 2001:11). This is the "irreducible core of necessities invariant through time:"..."water, food, shelter and clothing (Sarlo 1992: 19)" which remains the same through time but the "quantity and quality" are relative to one's society.)

OECD and UNICEF rate Canada's poverty rate much higher using a relative poverty threshold. Statistics Canada's LICO, which Sarlo also rejects, also result in higher poverty rates. According to a 2008 report by the Organisation for Economic Co-operation and Development (OECD), the rate of poverty in Canada, is among the highest of the OECD member nations, the world's wealthiest industrialized nations. There is no official government definition and therefore, measure, for poverty in Canada. However, Dennis Raphael, author of Poverty in Canada: Implications for Health and Quality of Life reported that the United Nations Development Program (UNDP), the United Nations Children's Fund (UNICEF), the Organisation for Economic Co-operation and Development (OECD) and Canadian poverty researchers (Note: The Conference Board of Canada "uses the OECD's relative measure of child poverty, which calculates the proportion of children living in households where disposable income is less than 50 per cent of the median in each country." The Conference Board 2013 cautioned that Canada's high poverty rate, ranks among the worst of the 17 countries they compared. "Canada's child poverty rate was 15.1 per cent, up from 12.8 per cent in the mid-1990s. Only the United States ranked lower.) find that relative poverty is the "most useful measure for ascertaining poverty rates in wealthy developed nations such as Canada." In its report released the Conference Board

== United States ==
According to the US Department of Health and Human Services, an individual who makes $12,760 a year is considered below the poverty line. This amount is enough to cover living and transportation payments, bills, food, and clothing. In the United States, 13.1 percent of the population are reported to fall below the poverty level.

=== Government programs ===
==== SNAP ====
The Supplemental Nutrition Assistance Program, or SNAP, (formerly known as the Food Stamp Program) distributes food vouchers to households with incomes that fall within 130% of the federal poverty threshold. They support approximately 40 million people, including low income workers, unemployed citizens, and disabled heads of household. This program is an entitlement program, meaning if anyone is qualified, they will receive the benefits. The Food Stamp Program, the former name of SNAP, first began as a temporary program under President Roosevelt's (FDR) administration in 1939, allowing its recipients to buy surplus food determined by the Department. According to the US Department of Agriculture (USDA), the idea is credited to Henry Wallace, Secretary of Agriculture, and Milo Perkins, the program's first Administrator. After the program was discontinued from 1943 to 1961, the Food Stamp Program gradually expanded and became permanent during President Johnson's term in 1964. The program eventually grew nationwide, accepting more people and becoming more accessible. In the 1980s, the government addressed the extreme food insecurity in the US, leading to improvements like the sales tax elimination on food stamps. SNAP became eligible to the homeless and grew in resources, including nutrition education. 2013 marked their highest recipient rate, gradually decreasing to 42 million people in 2017. SNAP is the largest part of the government's Farm Bill, which is passed by Congress every five years. After much debate on funding, Congress passed the Farm Bill in 2018, portioning $664 billion to mainly SNAP. SNAP is proven to be highly beneficial to its participants, preventing a majority of households from reaching below the poverty line. Data from the USDA indicates that children who participate in SNAP are connected to more positive health effects and economic outcomes. 10% of SNAP recipients are reported to rise above the poverty line, and economic self-sufficiency especially increases for women. Furthermore, research by Mark Zandi has shown that a $1 increase in food stamp payments also increases GDP by $1.73.

The current benefits of SNAP, however, is threatened by proposals to cut funding and limit eligibility requirements. In the recent passing of the Farm Bill, there were attempts to limit eligibility and reduce benefits, which would affect about 2 million people. Ultimately, overall bipartisan support kept the total funding and prevented the proposals from being enacted. Along with this recent threat, there have been proposals to limit the programs in the past. In the mid-1990s, Congress imposed time limits for unemployed adults that were not disabled or raising children. In 2014, Republican representatives wanted to cut 5% of the program's funding, about $40 billion, for the next ten years. This did not pass, but funds were still cut by 1%, or $8.6 billion, creating limitations in the program. In 2017, the House of Representatives proposed to cut $150 billion from SNAP's funding through 2026. However, the cuts were not enacted, and the original budget amount remained. These past threats to the funding of SNAP imply an uncertain future for its ongoing benefits.

==== WIC ====
The Special Supplemental Nutrition Program for Women, Infants, and Children, best known as the WIC program, offers referrals to health care, nutrition information, and nutritious foods to low-income women, infants, and children who are at risk of health issues. Unlike SNAP, WIC is a federal grant program that runs under a specific amount of funds by the government, meaning not everyone who is qualified will receive benefits. WIC was first introduced in 1972 and became permanent in 1974. This program helps approximately 7.3 million participants each month and is reported to support 53% of infants born in the United States. In 2017, annual costs were $5.6 billion. Like SNAP, WIC is researched to also be highly effective for its participants. Benefits of WIC is associated with less premature and infant deaths and fewer occasions of low birthrates. Economically, $1.77 to $3.13 is saved in health care costs for each dollar invested in WIC.

==== HFFI ====
The Healthy Food Financing Initiative (HFFI) addresses place-based theories of poverty, aiming to develop grocery store chains in low-income communities and improve access to nutritious food. In the early 2000s, the metaphor of food deserts- low income communities that do not have access to grocery stores and nutritious foods- have been connected to health disparities. More than 29 million of US residents are reported to live in neighborhoods that resemble a food desert. The concept of the food desert has been increasingly linked to spatial reasons of poverty. It was understood that the food desert was the main reason why there were nutritional concerns in these neighborhoods. In 2010, President Obama introduced HFFI, which was passed by Congress in 2014 through the Farm Bill.

=== Criticisms of government programs ===
==== Criticism of SNAP ====
In the Oxford Academic journal, Social Work, Adriana Flores- a socialist advocate- brings attention to the limitations of government programs such as SNAP. Flores states that while the government assists people with food insecurity through SNAP, important basic needs like hygiene products are excluded, ultimately forcing low-income people to decide between hygiene items and other living payments. Flores considers SNAP as one of the few entitlement programs that need to be expanded.

==== Criticism of HFFI ====
In the International Journal of Urban and Regional Research, Laura Wolf-Powers criticizes HFFI, arguing that these policies imply that the origins of food insecurity mainly derive from geographical reasons. She and other scholars claim that income-centered policies would be significantly more effective. Wolf provides evidence that families with lower incomes have a larger tendency to live in food deserts. This makes them more prone to health issues and nutrition deprivation. Studies directly investigating shopping behavior of low-income residents disclose that their shopping decisions depend more on price, quality, staff, and similarities to other shoppers than simply the location of the store. The studies show that income is a more urgent reason than distance. Despite these studies and calls for reform, the journal illustrates the government's unwillingness to reform policies toward income redistribution and wage floors. The scholars notice optimistic changes in 2016, when 19 states established minimum wages, increasing economic self-sufficiency. This study seeks to criticize the government's spatial approach using investments and avoidance of income policies and labels the primary source of food insecurity as a lack of income.

=== Nongovernmental responses to basic needs insecurity ===
==== Food pantries on college campuses ====
Another project that started within the community is food pantries on college campuses. Food pantries were created to provide food at no cost and decrease food insecurity among students. In 2008, issues of food insecurity and homelessness among students were recognized by student affairs professionals due to the increasing tuition costs. A rising number of students especially in community colleges were experiencing food insecurity or homelessness, reaching between a fifth to two-thirds of American college students. This was more prevalent among Black and Latino communities, students in households that receive less than $20,000 in income, students with dependents, and former foster youth. They were reported to be skipping meals and purchasing cheaper foods, usually processed and unhealthy. These food pantries were founded by student leaders who advocated to improve food security and who also experienced food insecurity themselves. In the New Directions for Community Colleges, an academic journal, Jarrett Gupton observed food pantries and other solutions that benefited students. Because food pantries are limited due to the amount of food, staff, and hours of availability, Gupton suggests increasing students’ food literacy and utilizing community gardens, co-ops, and having affordable on-campus food plans. Although these nongovernmental approaches are beneficial to the public and spreading awareness of these basic needs issues, these projects are limited and cannot reach everyone in need. This issue leads to debates about government reforms and adopting a Rights-based approach to development to combat basic needs insecurity.

== See also ==
- Anthropological theories of value
- Basic income
- Economic security
- Guaranteed minimum income
- Housing First
- Human right to water and sanitation
- Living wage, a wage that is high enough to meet basic needs
- Maslow's hierarchy of needs
- Poverty threshold
- Poverty
- Right to a healthy environment
- Right to clothing
- Right to food
- Right to health
- Right to housing
- Right to property
- Right to rest and leisure
- Security of person
- Universal basic services
- Universal health care
- WHO Model List of Essential Medicines
