= Jonah complex =

Fear of success or realizing potential

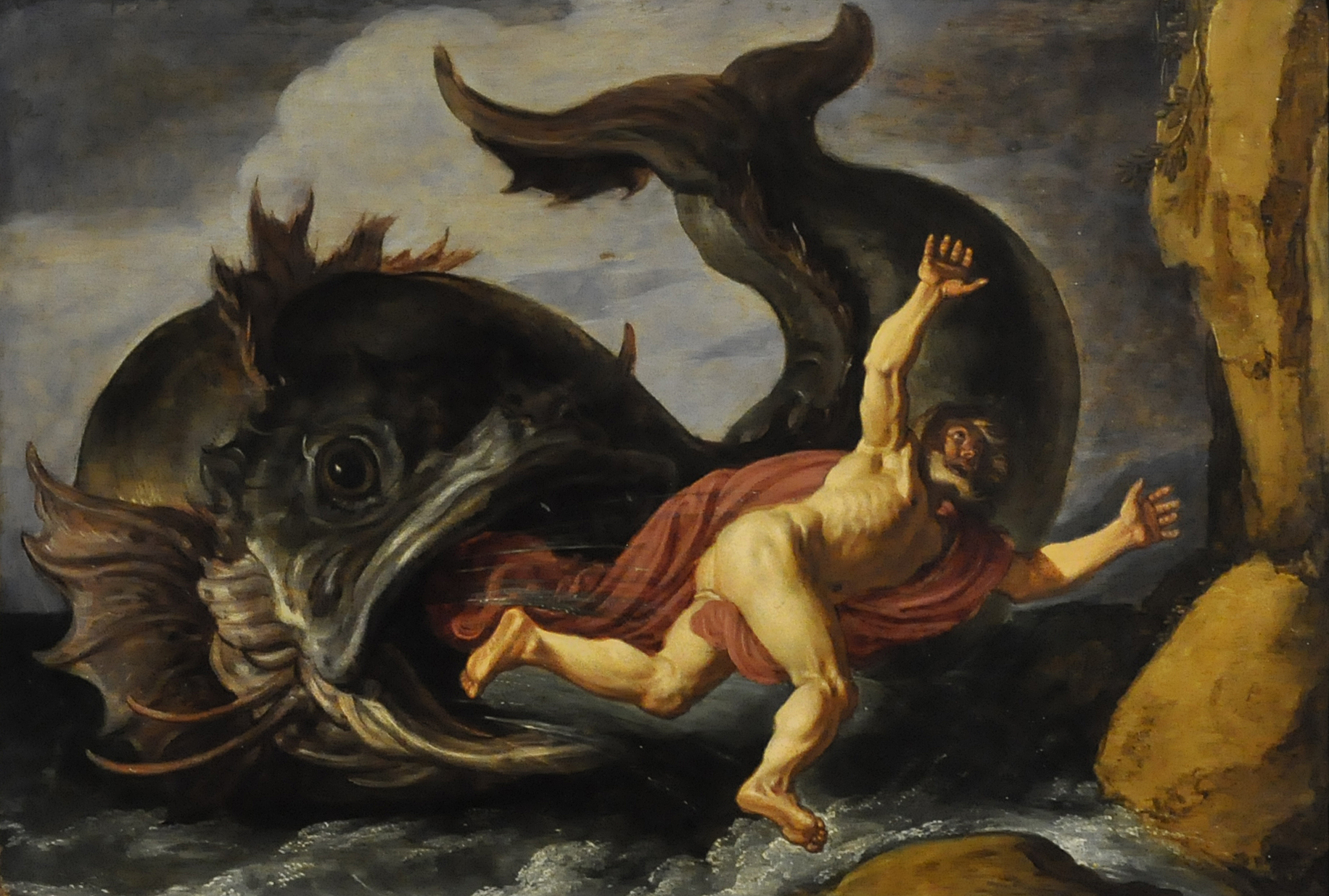
Jonah escapes from the belly of the great fish that has held him captive.

The Jonah complex is the fear of success or the fear of being one's best self. This fear prevents self-actualization, or the realization of one's own potential. It is the fear of one's own greatness, the evasion of one's destiny, or the avoidance of exercising one's talents. As the fear of achieving a personal worst may serve to motivate personal growth, likewise the fear of achieving a personal best may hinder achievement.

The Jonah complex is evident in neurotic people.

== Etymology ==
Although Abraham Maslow is credited for the term, the name "Jonah complex" was originally suggested by Maslow's friend, Professor Frank E. Manuel. The name comes from the story of the Biblical prophet Jonah's evasion of the destiny to prophesy the destruction of Nineveh. Maslow states, "So often we run away from the responsibilities dictated (or rather suggested) by nature, by fate, even sometimes by accident, just as Jonah tried—in vain—to run away from his fate".

== Causes ==
Any dilemma, paradox or challenge faced by an individual may trigger reactions related to the "Jonah complex". These challenges may vary in degree and intensity. Such challenges may include career changes, beginning new stages in life, moving to new locations, interviews or auditions, and undertaking new interpersonal commitments such as marriage. The crux of the Jonah Complex distinguishes to the subject an inability to differentiate humility from self-helplessness. Other causes include:

- Fear of the sense of responsibility and work required that often attends recognizing one's own greatness, talents, potential
- Fear that an extraordinary life would be too much out of the ordinary, and hence not acceptable to others inciting xenophobic rejection
- Fear by association of the ability honed being heightened and elevated as subject to a traumatic unrelated event, complex or memory
- Fear of seeming arrogant, self-centered, etc.
- Difficulty envisioning oneself as a prominent or authoritative figure

== See also ==
- Impostor syndrome
- Metamotivation
- Setting up to fail
- Tall poppy syndrome
