= Functional prerequisites =

Basic needs

In sociological research, functional prerequisites are the basic needs (food, shelter, clothing, and money) that an individual requires to live above the poverty line. Functional prerequisites may also refer to the factors that allow a society to maintain social order.

On the other hand, Parsons argued any successful social system has four functional prerequisites:

- Adaptation
- Goal attainment
- Integration
- Pattern maintenance

Adaptation – To survive, any society needs the basics of food and shelter. Having these gives any society control over its environment. A society needs a functioning economy to provide this.

Goal attainment – all societies must provide collective goals of some sort for its members to aspire it. Governments set goals such as New Labour setting a target of 50% of school graduates to attend university. To facilitate meeting such goals, governments provide resources, laws, and other institutional mechanisms.

Integration – all societies need a legal system that mediates conflict and protects the social system from breaking down.

Pattern maintenance – Institutions like education and the family reaffirm the essential values needed for society to function. (For Parsons the key institution in passing on such basic values is religion.)

== See also ==
- Maslow's hierarchy of needs
