= Food deserts in the United States =

Areas with poor access to healthy foods

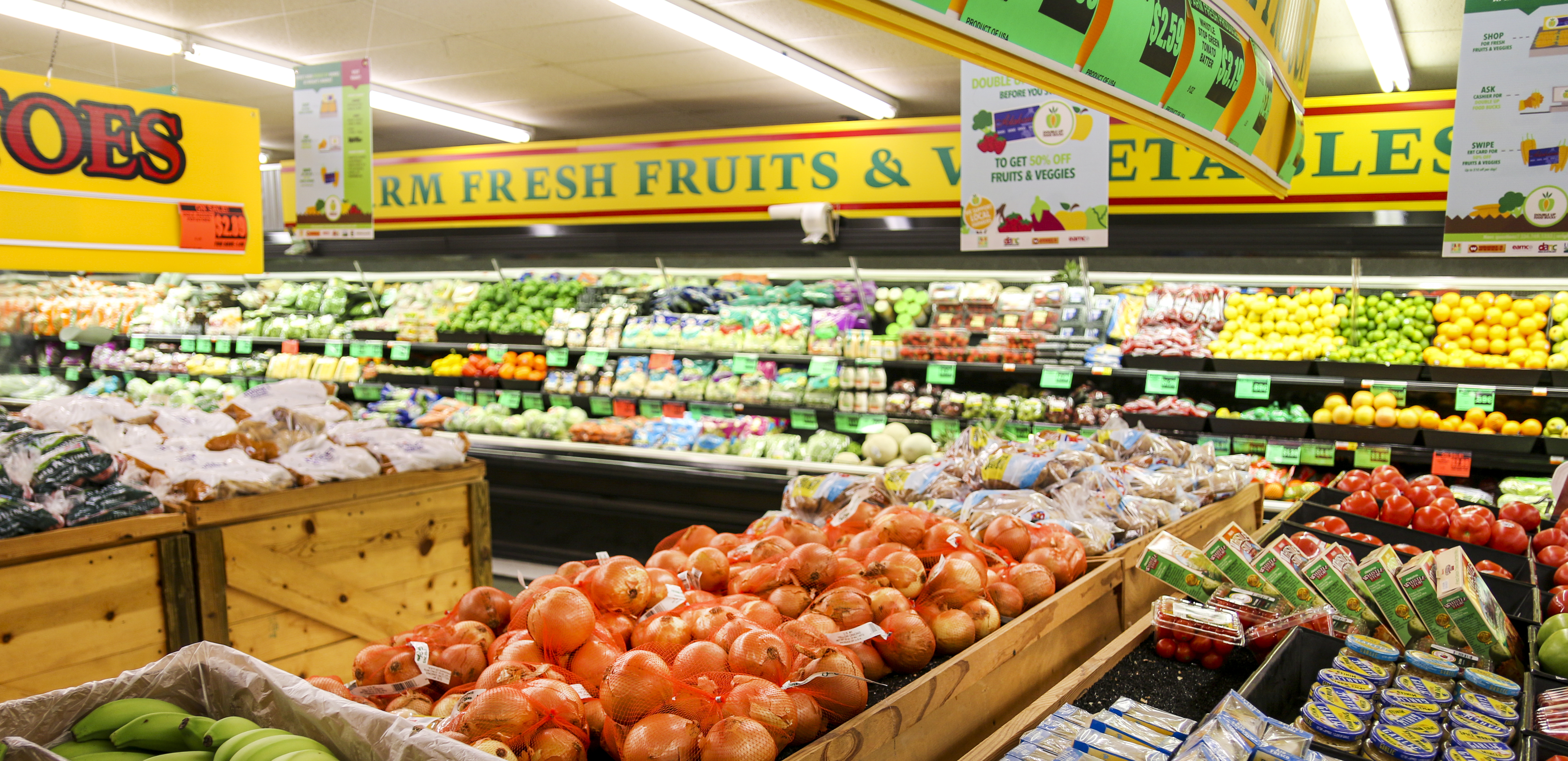
A produce section of a grocery store

Food deserts are generally defined as regions that lack access to supermarkets and affordable, healthy foods, particularly in low-income communities. According to the USDA's most recent report on food access, as of 2017, approximately 39.5 million people – 12.9% of the US population – lived in low-income and low food access.

In urban areas, higher levels of poverty have been associated with lower access to supermarkets. Food access has been shown to disproportionately affect Black communities: several studies have observed that neighborhoods with higher proportions of Black residents tend to have fewer supermarkets and further retail access, disproportionately affecting food security levels within the community.

While food deserts have historically been assessed through geographical measures of food access, aspects of a region's food environment, built environment, and socioeconomic characteristics are becoming increasingly recognized in defining and identifying food deserts. The USDA measures food access across different geographical regions by considering different indicators of food access such as proximity to a store, individual-level resources, and neighborhood-level structures that influence a household's access to food.

The rise of large supermarket chains in affluent suburban areas surrounding inner cities led to the decline of smaller, independently owned grocery stores within urban areas. This resulted in regions where affordable food options are primarily accessible to individuals with the means to pay for public transportation or their own personal vehicles.

Another explanation for the emergence of food deserts in the United States is the increased economic segregation between 1970 and 1988 that accompanied the migration of wealthy households to suburban areas from inner-city neighborhoods. This resulted in the median household income in inner-city areas declining, which prompted the closure of many supermarkets in large cities.

== History ==
The loss of enforcement of the Robinson-Patman Act in the 1980s was the primary cause of food deserts in the United States. This meant that grocery suppliers gave better prices to large supermarket chains, leaving smaller supermarkets unable to compete. According to Mitchell, "Food deserts were not, by the way, a consequence of suburbanization and white flight".

Subsequent policies and studies in the 1990s framed food deserts as an issue of what Americans were eating. Further studies in the 2000s and 2010s have served to correct the framing as an issue of where Americans lived. Such corrections in addressing food deserts served to give those most impacted a greater voice on the matter, especially Black residents in lower-income communities. Studies have further shown that attention to these neighborhoods were historically attributed to health and food rather than food markets leaving these neighborhoods in itself.

The rise of large supermarket chains in affluent suburban areas surrounding inner cities led to the decline of smaller, independently owned grocery stores within urban areas. This resulted in regions where affordable food options are primarily accessible to individuals with the means to pay for public transportation or their own personal vehicles.

Another explanation for the emergence of food deserts in the United States is the increased economic segregation between 1970 and 1988 that accompanied the migration of wealthy households to suburban areas from inner-city neighborhoods. This resulted in the median household income in inner-city areas declining, which prompted the closure of many supermarkets in large cities.

Early research on food deserts in the United States emerged in the late 1900s to the early 2000s. During this time, researchers began looking into how neighborhood food environments shaped health outcomes. Initial studies often framed food deserts only as spatial problems, only focusing on the decline of supermarkets in low-income neighborhoods and the distance barriers residents faced. Over time, researchers questioned this framing, emphasizing the fact that disparities in food access are affected by economic inequality. This shift contributed to more expanded approaches to understanding food deserts in U.S. research.

== Definitions ==
=== Distance ===
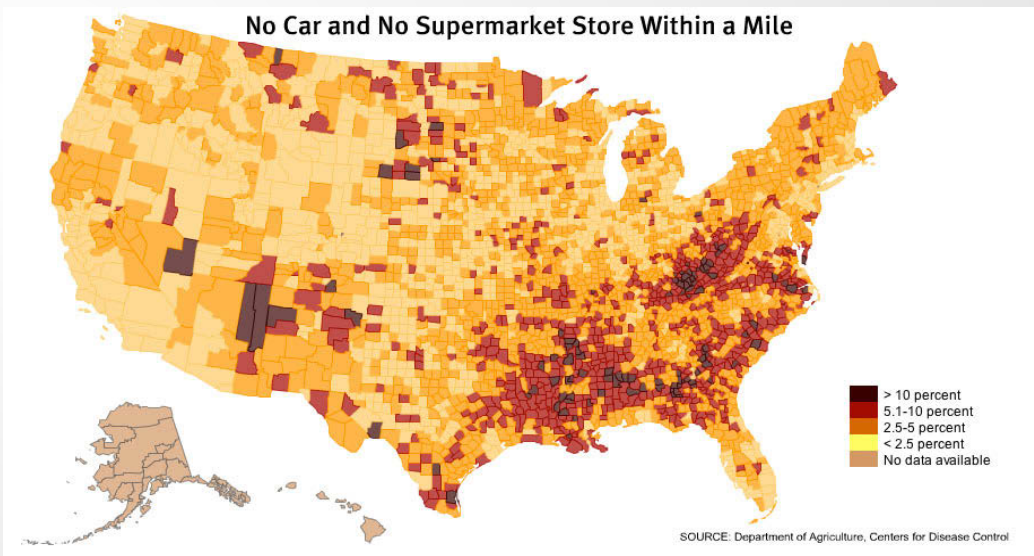
A 2016 USDA map. According to the Medley Food Desert Project, in 2017, nearly 24 million Americans lived in food deserts. Food deserts are heavily concentrated in southern states, which correlates with concentration of poverty, including the south's Black belt. The map shows the percentage of people without cars living in areas with no supermarket within a mile.

Distance-based measurements measure food accessibility to identify food deserts. The United States Department of Agriculture (USDA) Economic Research Service measures distance by dividing the country into multiple 0.5 km square grids. The distance from the geographic center of each grid to the nearest grocery store gauges food accessibility for the people living in that grid.

Different factors are excluded or included that affect the scale of distance. The USDA maintains an online interactive mapping tool for the United States, the "Food Access Research Atlas", which applies four different measurement standards to identify areas of low food access, based on distance from the nearest supermarket.

The first standard uses the original USDA food desert mapping tool "Food Desert Locator". It defines food deserts as having at least 33% or 500 people of a census tract's population in an urban area living 1 mile (10 miles for rural area) from a large grocery store or supermarket.

The second and third standards adjust the scale of distance and factor income to define a food desert. In the US, a food desert is a low-income census tract residing at least 0.5 miles (0.80 km) in urban areas (10 miles (16 km) in rural areas), or 1 mile (1.6 km) away in urban areas (20 miles in rural areas) from a large grocery store. The availability of other fresh food sources like community gardens and food banks are not included in mapping, and can change the number of communities that should be classified as food deserts.

A 2014 geographical survey found that the average distance from a grocery store was 1.76 kilometers (1.09 miles) in Edmonton but only 1.44 kilometers (0.89 miles) when farmers' markets and community gardens were included, which makes it 0.11 miles under the latter definition for an urban food desert.

The fourth standard takes vehicular mobility into account. In the US, a food desert has 100 households or more with no vehicle access living at least 0.5 miles (0.80 km) from the nearest large grocery store. For populations with vehicle access, the standard changes to 500 households or more living at least 20 miles (32 km) away. Travel duration and mode may be other important factors. As of 2011, public transport is not included in mapping tools.

=== Fresh food availability ===
A food retailer is typically considered to be a healthful food provider if it sells a variety of fresh food, including fruits and vegetables. Food retailers like fast-food restaurants and convenience stores are typically not in this category as they usually offer a limited variety of foods that constitutes a healthy diet. Frequently, even if there is produce sold at convenience stores, it is of poor quality. A "healthy" bodega, as defined by the New York City Department of Health and Mental Hygiene, stocks seven or more varieties of fresh fruits and vegetables and low-fat milk.

Different countries have different dietary models and views on nutrition. The distinct national nutrition guides add to the controversy surrounding the definition of food deserts. Since a food desert is defined as an area with limited access to nutritious foods, a universal identification of them cannot be created without a global consensus on nutrition.

Access to fresh food involve economic mobility and affordability. While there are ways in which the government actively support's nutritional accessibility, individuals facing food insecurity utilize different strategies to cope. Individuals revert to restricting their diet, choosing cheaper foods that are more processed and less nutritious, skip meals, or choose not to purchase mediations and or other products so they can purchase food instead. Such strategies lead to long term issues such as obesity.

To address this issue, policies and systemic strategies involve the implementation of SNAP, WIC, and the National School Lunch Program. It is then mostly economic safety nets that address the health issues faced by those who are food insecure. Additionally, more participatory approaches such as community investment can offer similar relief to those who face food insecurity.

Additionally, more participatory approaches such as community investment can offer similar relief to those who lack access to fresh food. Local governments use development funds from U.S. Department of Housing and Urban Development to fund projects such as grocery co-ops in areas that lack accessibility to fresh food. Some state officials also promote corporate chains to fill the void created by food deserts, relying on corporate commerce as a solution to an embedded social and racial problem. In Oakland, California, communities respond to lack of fresh food's by creating urban gardens.

=== Income and food prices ===
Other criteria include affordability and income level. According to the USDA, researchers should "consider... [the] prices of foods faced by individuals and areas" and how "prices affect the shopping and consumption behaviors of consumers." A 2012 study maintains that estimates of how many people live in food deserts must include the cost of food in supermarkets that can be reached in relation to their income.

For instance, in 2013, Whole Foods Market opened a store in the New Center area of Detroit, where one third of the population lives below the poverty line. Whole Foods is known for its more expensive healthy and organic foods. To attract low income residents, the Detroit store offered lower prices than other Whole Foods stores. If Whole Foods had not lowered the prices, residents would not be willing to shop there, and that area of Detroit would still be considered a food desert.

=== Measurements and Metrics ===
Researchers have used many methods to measure and classify food deserts in the United States; one of them being spatial proximity to food retailers. Researches assess proximity between residential areas and supermarkets or large grocery stores. These metrics are widely used in food access research because they provide a standardized way to view areas with limited food.

Researchers have found limitations in relying on only spatial proximity as a measure of food access. Studies show that distance to grocery stores does not include key factors such as food affordability, household income, and transportation access. As a result of this, different measurement frameworks may classify the same area differently, which leads to inconsistent assessments across different studies.

== Related terms ==
Much of the language behind food deserts is focused on how food inequities are routinely caused by anti-black racism. These terms serve to criticize race-neutral approaches to food desert scholarship and add more context to how industry practices exacerbate inequalities in food access.

=== Supermarket redlining ===
While supermarket redlining is usually used as a substitute for "food desert", supermarket redlining began use as a formal term first. The term was first used in a 2001 article by Elizabeth Eisenhauer titled "In Poor Health: Supermarket Redlining and Urban Nutrition". The article presented data on how grocery stores purposefully avoided low-income neighborhoods. Academics such as Alison Alkon and Teresa Mares use their own definition and framing of supermarket redlining to refer to the history of banks having discriminatory lending practices towards Black people.

Other academics such as Naa Oyo Kwate, Ji Meng Loh, and Kellee White use the related term "retail redlining". They define retail redlining as "spatial discrimination whereby retailers, particularly chain stores, fail to serve neighborhoods or target them for unfavorable treatment based on the racial composition of the customers and/or store operators."

=== Food Sovereignty ===
Food Sovereignty is a political and social concept that emphasizes the right of communities to control and produce their own food systems according to their local resources and cultures, rather than relying on external markets. This idea originated from the global peasant movement La Via Campesina and it focuses on community empowerment and control over food production and distribution. Food sovereignty highlights how systemic racism and loss of control over local land and resources create the conditions of a food desert. It promotes urban agriculture and community-led decision-making to address food deserts and to ensure that there is equal access to food.

=== Ethnic market ===
Ethnic markets are grocery stores that cater to specific cultural or ethnic communities by providing familiar foods and products. These stores play an important role in the food routines of immigrants and refugees, many of whom feel uncomfortable in large supermarkets where food is unfamiliar and language barriers exist. These stores are often overlooked when quantifying food access and food deserts.

=== Food environment ===
A food environment is a broad framework used to describe the physical, social, and economic contexts that influence food availability and dietary behavior. This includes, type, affordability, and density of food retailers within a neighborhood or area. Public health research uses this concept to understand food deserts in a wider set of structural factors that affect health and nutrition.

=== Agribusiness ===
Agribusiness involves the collective business activities that influence agricultural production, chemical and seed supply, processing, machinery, distribution, and marketing. Over time, consolidation of firms like transnational corporations emerge creating high market concentration and vertical integration that impacts farmers abilities to compete and survive. In response to market competition, United States farmers join agricultural cooperatives to stay competitive. Their participation in agricultural cooperatives provide them with services like access to the market enhancing the ability to compete with investor owned firms on a global scale. Similarly, in the process of corporate consolidation, food industries such as the meat industry have been transformed through vertical integration. This impacts farmers and their ability to practice food sovereignty as they are reliant upon market needs.

== Types ==
=== Rural food deserts ===
The differences between a rural and an urban food desert are the population density of residents and their distance from the nearest supermarket. Twenty percent of rural areas in the U.S. are classified as food deserts. There are small areas within each state in the U.S. that are classified as rural food deserts, but they occur most prominently in the Midwest. Within these counties, approximately 2.4 million individuals have low access to a large supermarket. The difference in distance translates into pronounced economic and transportation differences between rural and urban areas. Rural food deserts are mostly the result of large supermarket stores moving into areas and creating competition that makes it impossible for small businesses to survive. The competition causes many small grocers to go out of business. That makes the task of getting nutritious whole ingredients much more difficult for those who live far away from large supermarkets.

A 2007 study found that people who live in rural food deserts are more likely to lack a high school degree or GED, to experience increased poverty rates, and to have lower median family income. People who live in rural food deserts also tend to be older, because of an exodus of young people (ages 20–29) born in such areas who decide to leave once they can.

From 2013 County Health Ratings data, residents who live in rural U.S. food deserts are more likely to have poorer health than those who live in urban food deserts. People who live in rural communities have significantly lower scores in the areas of health behavior, morbidity factors, clinical care, and physical environment. Research attributes the discrepancies to a variety of factors, including limitations in infrastructure, socioeconomic differences, insurance coverage deficiencies, and a higher rate of traffic fatalities and accidents.

A 2009 study showed that of the people polled, 64% did not have access to adequate daily amounts of vegetables, and 44.8% did not have access to adequate daily amounts of fruits. Comparatively, only 29.8% of those polled lacked access to adequate protein. The lack of access to fruits and vegetables often results in vitamin deficiencies, which eventually causes health problems for those who live within these areas. Tasked with finding a solution to the problem, research has shown that it takes individual and community actions, as well as public policy improvements, to maintain and increase the capacity of rural grocery stores to provide nutritious high-quality affordable foods and to be profitable enough to stay in business.

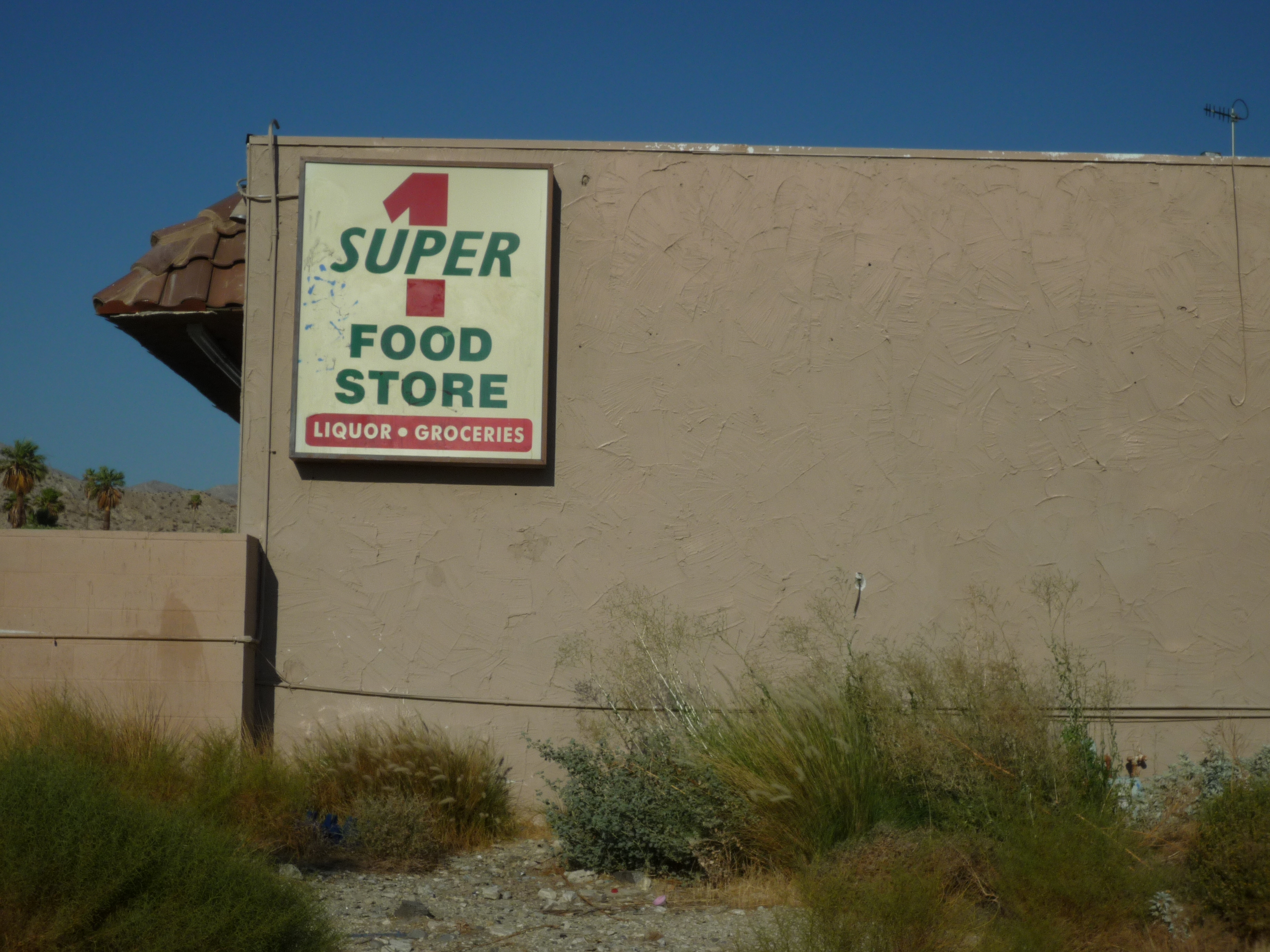
Super Food Store in Desert Hot Springs, California

A 2009 study found that although personal factors impact eating behavior for rural people, it is the physical and social environments that place constraints on food access, even in civically engaged communities. Food access may be improved in communities in which civic engagement is strong and local organizations join in providing solutions to help decrease barriers of food access. Some ways that communities can do so are increasing access to the normal and food safety net systems and creating informal alternatives. Some informal communal alternatives could be community food gardens and informal transportation networks. Existing federal programs could be boosted through greater volunteer involvement.

A 2009 study of rural food deserts found key differences in overall health, access to food, and the social environment of rural residents when they were compared to urban dwellers. Rural residents report overall poorer health and more physical limitations, with 12% rating their health as fair or poor, compared to 9% of urban residents. They believed their current health conditions to be shaped by their eating behaviors when the future chronic disease risk was affected by the history of dietary intake.

The 57 recruited rural residents from Minnesota and Iowa in one study perceived that food quality and variety in their area were poor at times. The researchers reached the conclusion that for a community of people, food choice bound by family and household socioeconomic status remained as a personal challenge, but social and physical environments played a significant role in stressing and in shaping their dietary behaviors.

=== Urban food deserts ===
There is often a greater concentration of fast-food chains and small corner-stores that sell ready-made foods in urban areas compared to wealthier areas. The area that a person lives in affects how easily they can access food. Food deserts occur in poor urban areas with limited or no access to healthful affordable food options. Low income families are more likely to not have access to transportation so tend to be negatively affected by food deserts. An influx of people moving into such urban areas has magnified the existing problems of food access. A 2018 study found that urban areas have been progressing in terms of certain opportunities, but the poor continue to struggle. As people move to urban areas, they have been forced to adopt new methods for cooking and acquiring food. In 2018, adults in urban areas tend to be obese, but they have malnourished and underweight children.

A 2012 study found that for many people, the reason for not being able to get nutritious food is a lack of supermarkets or grocery stores. When supermarkets are inaccessible, it has been shown that vegetable and fruit consumption are lower. When prices are high and there is a lack of financial assistance, many living in places with limited grocery stores find themselves in a situation of being unable to get the food that they need. A 2017 study found that food deserts tend to be in places where poor minority communities reside. Sometimes, the issue with urban food deserts is not the lack of food in the area, but rather the lack of nutritional knowledge about food.

In 2009 research by Tulane University, 2.3 million Americans lived more than one mile away from a supermarket and did not own a car. For those that live in urban food deserts, they often do not have access to culturally-appropriate foods. For many people who have health restrictions and food allergies, the effects of food deserts are further compounded. The time and cost it takes for people to go to the grocery store makes fast food more desirable. There is also a price variance in small grocery stores that prevents people in lower-income areas from purchasing healthier food options. Smaller grocery stores can be more expensive than the larger chains.

== Initiatives and resources ==
Recognition of food deserts as a major public health concern has prompted a number of initiatives to address the lack of resources available for those living in both urban and rural areas. On the larger scale, there have been national public policy initiatives.

=== United States Federal and state policy initiatives ===
The United States government responded to food insecurity with several programs, one of which being the Domestic Nutrition Assistance Programs (DNAPs). Other programs include the Supplemental Nutrition Assistance Program (SNAP), the Special Supplement Nutrition Program for Women, Infants, and Children (WIC), and food pantries and emergency kitchens. In 2013, there was a significant lack of legislation on local and state levels to address the problem efficiently and adequately. As food insecurity has reached drastic levels, significant pressure for the government to qualify the problem as a human rights issue has proven futile.

In 2010, the US Department of Health and Human Services, the US Department of Agriculture, and the US Department of the Treasury announced their partnership in the development of the Healthy Food Financing Initiative (HFFI). Intending to expand access to healthy food options in both urban and rural communities across the country, HFFI has helped expand and develop grocery stores, corner stores, and farmers' markets by providing financial and technical assistance to communities. The creation of such resources provides nutritious food options to those living in food deserts. HFFI has awarded $195 million to community development organizations in 35 states. Between 2011 and 2015, HFFI created or supported 958 projects aimed at healthy food access.

The HFFI has supported the development of statewide programs across the country, in California, Colorado, Illinois, Louisiana, Michigan, New Jersey, New York, Ohio, and Pennsylvania. In Pennsylvania, the state program, the Fresh Food Financing Initiative (FFFI), provides grants and loans to healthy food retailers to create or renovate markets, including supermarkets, small stores, and farmers' markets, in low-income urban and rural areas across Pennsylvania. Because operating in underserved areas is more financially straining on retailers, the program provides subsidized financing incentives for retailers to open in areas with a high need. The Pennsylvania program's success influenced many other states to launch similar programs.

=== Farmers' markets and community gardens ===
Local and community efforts have made strides in combating a lack of access to nutritious food in food deserts. Farmers' markets provide residents with fresh fruits and vegetables. Usually in public and central areas of a community, such as a park, farmers' markets are most effective if they are easily accessible. Farmers' markets tend to be more successful in urban than rural areas due to large geographic distances in rural areas that make the markets difficult to access.

The expansion of SNAP to farmers' markets helps make nutritious foods increasingly affordable. Each year, SNAP participants spend around $70 billion in benefits. As of 2015, more than $19.4 billion were redeemed at farmers' markets. The Double Up Food Bucks program doubles what every Electronic Benefit Transfer (EBT) dollar spent at a farm stand is worth. This incentivizes locals to shop for fresh foods, rather than processed foods. Community gardens can play a similar role in food deserts, generating fresh produce by having residents share in the maintenance of food production.

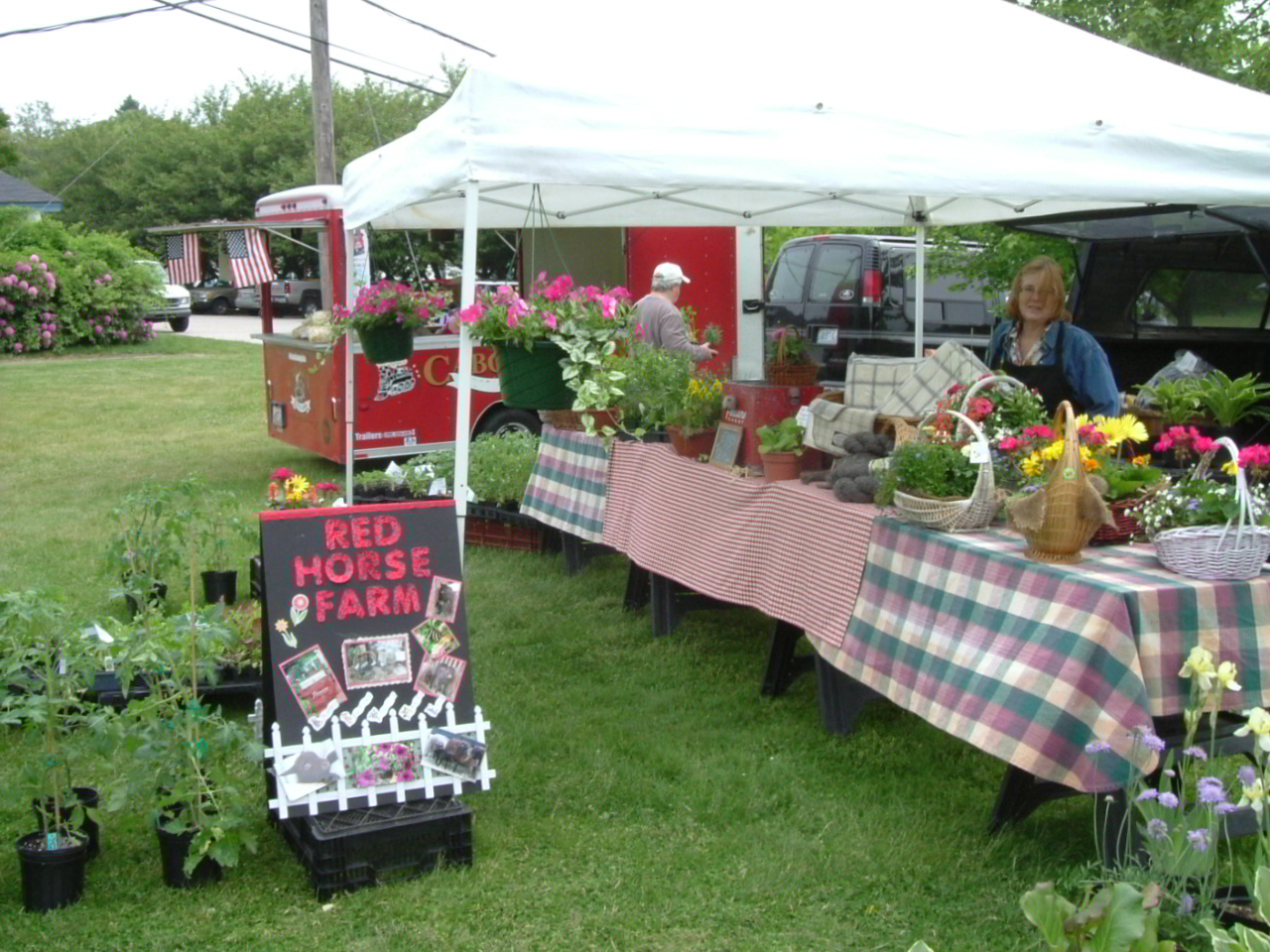
A farmers market in South Kingstown, Rhode Island

In 2018, The Food Trust, a nonprofit organization based in Pennsylvania, had 22 farmers' markets in operation throughout Philadelphia. To increase accessibility for healthier food and fresh produce, Food Trust farmers' markets accept SNAP benefits. Customers have reported improved diets with an increase in vegetable intake as well as healthier snacking habits.

Community gardens address fresh food scarcity. The nonprofit group DC Urban Greens operates a community garden in Southeast Washington, DC, an area labeled by the US Department of Agriculture as a food desert. The garden provides fresh produce to those in the city who do not have easily-accessible grocery stores nearby. The organization also sets up farmers' markets in the city.

In the food desert of North Las Vegas, a neighborhood with one of the highest levels of food insecurity, another community garden is addressing food scarcity. The community gardens can aid in education and access to new foods. Organizations such as the Detroit Black Community Food Security Network use community-building gardens to promote community around healthy food.

=== Food cooperatives ===
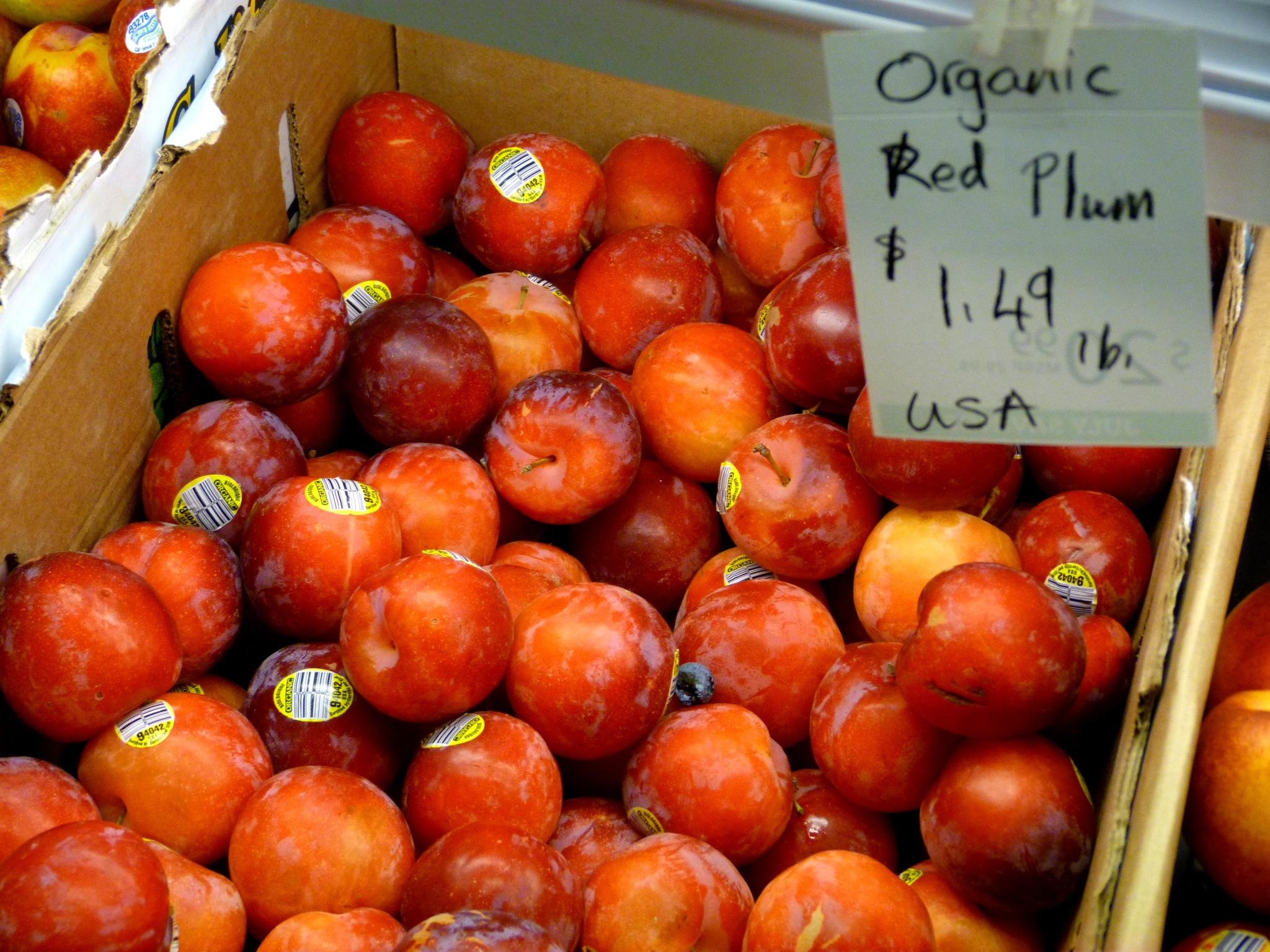
Plums at a Food Co-Op

Food cooperatives (co-ops) are defined as being community driven produce markets. Food co-ops have become a mechanism that communities have used in response to food deserts. Since they are run by community members, these groups can have a more direct decision to sell more culturally relevant and healthier produce to the overall community. Cooperatives oppose projects that place communities in a deficit lens that requires interventions. Cooperatives aim to restructure the involvement of top-down aid. Communities engage in individual skills and talents that contribute to a food cooperatives operation. Proponents to the implementation of food co-ops argue that it offers better dietary options which can uplift the most impacted communities in food deserts.

There have been efforts by urban American cities to implement food co-operations as a larger policy reform. Organizations like the West Oakland Food Collaborative have made food co-operations one of the components to their larger proposal to tackle food insecurity. There have also been efforts to integrate current federal aid to food co-operations. The Virginia Fresh Match (VFM) program worked with community efforts such as food co-ops to accept federally funded initiatives such as Supplemental Nutrition Assistance Program (SNAP) as a way to promote healthier eating habits.

Food cooperatives experience limitations that requires particular leadership that fosters equality between all members. Food cooperatives have a majority presence of middle and upper class populations creating a "foodie culture". During community meetings, there is a division between classes as well as visible racial organization, preventing potential community participation By intentionally structuring leadership to include less structurally advantage identities, cooperatives can meet the needs of all workers. Furthermore, elements of race are recurrent within food deserts and alleviation. Food cooperatives require acknowledging those who are victims to the industrial food system such as marginalized communities and producers. Food co-ops operate as an alternative that draw from racialized inequality such as redlining and food deserts as a result. Visibility is a key element in addressing the relationship between social and interactional inequalities that food cooperatives, through management, can ameliorate.

Additionally limitations to food co-operations come with the emphasis of community governance and different approaches to reallocate federal funding. Additionally, community governance requires particular leadership that fosters equality between members. During community meetings, there are spatially organized racial lines that prevent potential participation from all community members. Given that food co-ops are community-run, maintaining the market requires community members to dedicate hours to it. Previous government policy agreements with market chains have also made it difficult to repurpose these now-enclosed spaces, with the discontinued Albertsons market chains being a leading example of this predicament.

Cities with food deserts, such as Detroit, have advocated instead to create policies that financially incentivize healthy markets to build their establishments in these communities. Yet, research conducted in Flint's food desert found that policy reform should not focus on community access, since the implementation of healthy grocery stores will not decrease food insecurity or create healthier diets.

=== Urban agriculture ===
Urban agriculture (UA) is another way that helps when it comes to having access to fresh food in urban cities. Urban agriculture is one of the responses combating the lack of fresh foods in communities that need fresh foods. Historically born in America out of the need to alleviate hunger among Americans during troubling economic times, urban agriculture was significant during economic depressions. Mayors called on owners of vacant lots to lend their property to allow the city government to create gardening programs for hundreds of unemployed people to grow potatoes to sustain their families.

The economic success and improvement in food production of these programs led to urban gardens being used to supply food that supplied food for local communities, to augment the agricultural industry's capacity to send commercial production to troops overseas, thus supporting the war economy. This encouraged the growth of involvement in urban agriculture outside of war efforts, and in post-war decades, the urban agriculture movement became less of a top-down directive from national organizations and federal agencies and became more of a grassroots movement with social and environmental justice groups continuing to shape urban agricultural practices.

By the 1970s, urban farms were representative of community empowerment and grassroots activism, along with the initial reasons of education, nutrition, security, and employment. In more recent years, urban agricultural sites have continued to be used for youth education, cultural preservation, or to assist in community food security, with the support of the USDA's Office of Urban Agriculture and Innovative Production grants towards urban agriculture initiatives that began distribution in 2020.

There are communities that continue to turn vacant lots into a community gardens and urban areas in which they can use agriculture to grow fresh foods for the community. Urban agriculture has many benefits such as being a "local source of fresh healthy food", and bringing communities together and reducing environmental problems.

An issue with urban agriculture is that in many food desert communities, the soil has been contaminated from local pollutants, which makes it harder to use plots of land as a garden to grow fresh food. For example, in Oakland, California, there has been a rise in using urban agriculture as a means to get areas that are in the middle of food deserts to grow and produce their own food.

=== Meal delivery, food trucks, and ride shares ===
An entrepreneurial solution to food insecurity in food deserts is food trucks due to their capacities to transport groceries to residents living in areas with low retail access. In major urban centers such as Boston, mobile food markets travel to low-income areas with fresh produce. The trucks travel to assisted living communities, schools, workplaces, and health centers. The increased availability of online food retailers and delivery services, such as AmazonFresh and FreshDirect, can also help in food deserts by delivering food straight to residences. The ability of elderly people, disabled people, and people who live far from supermarkets to use SNAP benefits online to order groceries is a major resource. For those who lack transportation options, vehicle for hire services may be vital resources to increase access to nutritious foods in food deserts.

=== Youth education ===
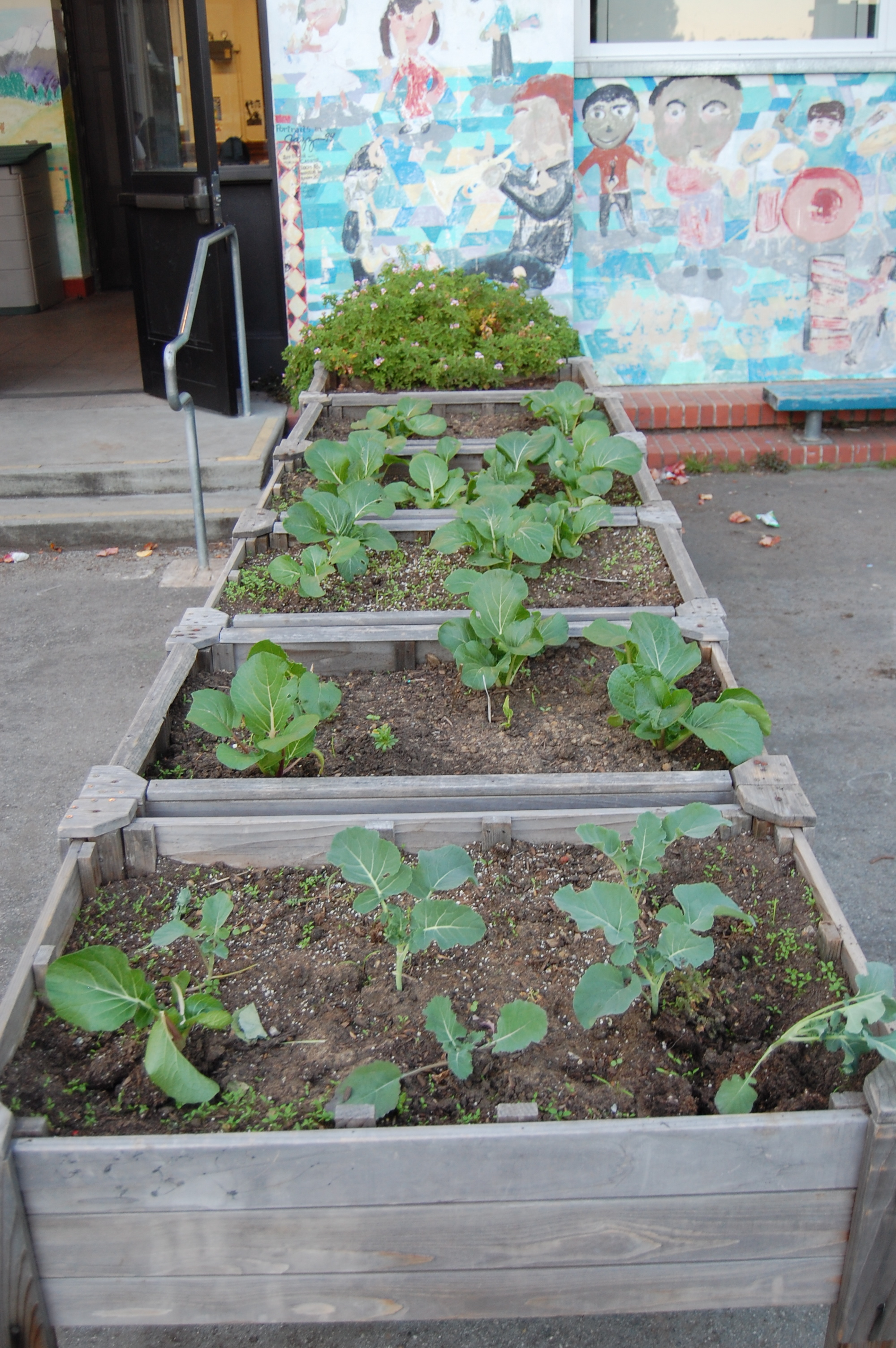
Urban Gardening at Alvarado Elementary School in Dallas, Texas

Several studies have cited improved dietary behaviors through educating children on healthy nutrition practices and food systems in school settings. Empowering children to make healthy food choices and learn about the origins of their food can encourage long-term healthy habits and attitudes around food, helping to promote consumption of healthy foods to the best of their extent in areas deemed food deserts. Youth education programs around nutrition, gardening, and food systems that establish and maintain community gardens can also make nutritious, fresh produce more easily accessible by residents living in food deserts.

For example, the Grow Hartford Program was implemented in a school in Connecticut to have students address an issue in their community and they chose to focus on food justice. The youth involved worked on farms in the area to learn about the processes of food production and the importance and variety of vegetables. The program led kids to start a community garden at their school. The program allowed the students to engage in hands-on learning to educate them about agriculture, food scarcity, and nutrition while helping bridge the gap of food access for some of their peers who could now bring home food from the surrounding farms or the school garden.

Another example of an organization that educates community members is Oakland Food Connection, located in East Oakland where they teach children about production and consumption through lessons on urban gardening with cooking classes. This program helps educate children about their own food culture and others while also learning about nutrition. Gardens in West Oakland are hosts of intergenerational relationships with senior citizens visiting and sharing traditional knowledge to the youth.

Baltimore City Public Schools work in tandem with Great Kids Farm in Catonsville to create educational field trip experiences that teach kids about food waste, farm-fresh cooking, and planting. Great Kids Farm works with Food Corps, which actively works alongside educators and school nutritionists to provide nourishing meals and food education. Their work is actively creating a new generation of young people who are given the education and experiences needed to make nutritious choices later.

A school garden, or a community urban farm with a youth program, where education about urban agriculture is implemented takes different approaches. One of them being the science route of growing food, which is a more technical way of teaching students about botany and horticulture. Another approach is focused on sharing the political and cultural knowledge of growing food, which looks like teaching students about food justice. Beyond the role of urban agriculture, the debate surrounding these approaches is generally condensed to the question of whether students should be taught political subjects in school settings in order to preserve a neutral learning environment for fear of indoctrinating students towards a certain political perspective.

In accordance, schools often require a tight connection between their curriculum and gardens to meet certain academic standards of excellence. Due to the nature of urbanization, there are limited opportunities for youth to interact with natural elements, but school gardens with rigid horticultural-based curriculum emphasize the exploration of important scientific concepts such as growth and decay, insect–plant interactions, nutrient cycling, and soil ecology.

There is a public argument that school settings need to have political philosophies at the core of education to show students the structural forces that make certain solutions, such as urban agriculture, necessary to alleviate inequality. Each approach produces different results in what the students learn and how they engage with their community or civic processes. A study that tests civic and/or community participation, conducted by the Department of Natural Resources and the Environment at Cornell University, surveys high school students between the ages 14–18 and found that involvement in urban agriculture fosters youth civic engagement because programs often focus on positive youth development, empowerment, community sustainability, and social justice.

The argument of technical versus political education is applicable in identifying the quality of school garden education between private education and public schools. The source of financial support creates a systematic difference between public and private schools that is evident through the demographics of students and teachers. Private school enrollment is dependent on the surrounding area income, which exhibits the opportunity for high-income families to choose where to send their children, while youth from low-income families are sent to public schools.

In impoverished urban neighborhoods with a majority demographic of people of color, students who attend public school are less likely to have access to learning in social and physical environments outside of school. The extent of political or technical education in school gardens is contingent on the type of schooling, also contributing to the differences in the outcomes of civic and/or community engagement.
