= Manfred Max-Neef's Fundamental human needs =

Taxonomy of needs and their attainment

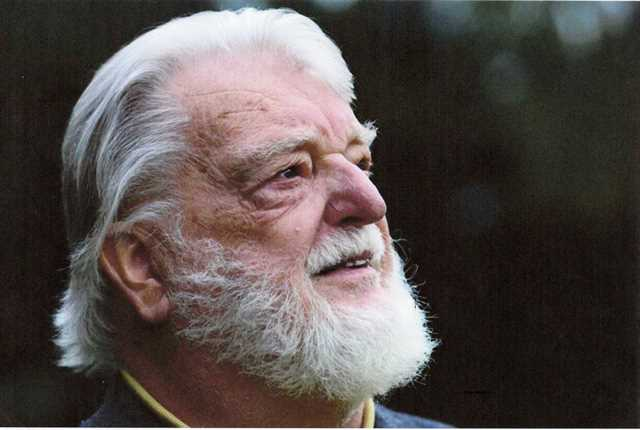
Manfred Max-Neef

A taxonomy of fundamental human needs and the ways in which these needs can be satisfied was developed by Manfred Max-Neef. This was based on his work on Human Scale Development, first published in 1986.

== Development and human needs ==
Human Scale Development is basically community development and is "focused and based on the satisfaction of fundamental human needs, on the generation of growing levels of self-reliance, and on the construction of organic articulations of people with nature and technology, of global processes with local activity, of the personal with the social, of planning with autonomy and of civil society with the state. Human needs, self-reliance, and organic articulations are the pillars which support Human Scale Development." Human Scale Development "assumes a direct and participatory democracy. This form of democracy nurtures those conditions that will help to transform the traditional, semi-paternalistic role of the Latin American state into a role of encouraging creative solutions flowing from the bottom upwards. This is more consistent with the real expectations of the people."

For improving the living conditions of people in Latin America, the following 3 statements are taken as a starting point:

1. Development is about people and not about things.
  When it comes to people and not just about things, the gross national product (GNP) cannot be taken as an indicator. Instead it has to be related to the quality of life (QOL). Quality of life depends on the possibilities people have to adequately satisfy their fundamental human needs.
2. Fundamental human needs are finite, limited in number, and classifiable.
  This is in contrast to the traditional idea that there are many human needs, and that they are insatiable.
3. Fundamental human needs are the same in all cultures and in all historical periods.
  This is in contrast to the traditional idea that human needs are subject to trends and vary to a great extent.

== Needs and satisfiers ==
A common shortcoming in existing literature and discussions about human needs is that the fundamental difference between needs and their satisfiers either is not made explicit or is completely overlooked. It may have to do with the difference between human needs and the conventional notion of economic "wants" which are infinite and insatiable. Satisfiers may include forms of organization, political structures, social practices, values and norms, spaces, types of behavior and attitudes. For example, a house can be a satisfier of the need for protection, but a family structure as well. Also one cannot say that a need is 'satisfied' or not. It is better to say that needs are satisfied to a greater or lesser extent.

We can even say that one of the aspects that determine a culture is the choice of the satisfiers of the fundamental human needs. In short: culturally determined are not the basic human needs, but the satisfiers of those needs. Cultural change is, among other things, a consequence of the dropping of traditional satisfiers and the adoption of new or different satisfiers.

In the context of Human Scale Development, needs do not only reflect (individual or collective) shortcomings. They can also be seen as (individual or collective) potential strengths.

Fundamental human needs must be understood as a system: that is, all fundamental human needs are interrelated and interactive. With the exception of the need for livelihood, that is, to stay alive, there is no hierarchy in the system. On the other hand, simultaneities, complementarities and trade-offs are characteristics of the process of satisfying needs. There is no one-to-one correspondence between needs and satisfiers. A satisfier can simultaneously contribute to the satisfaction of different needs or, conversely, a need may require different satisfiers to be satisfied.

In addition, needs have to be satisfied within three contexts: (a) in relation to oneself (Eigenwelt); (b) in relation to the social group (Mitwelt); and (c) with respect to the environment (Umwelt). The quality and intensity of the levels, and within the aforementioned contexts, will depend on time, location and circumstances. All of this also means that every fundamental human need that is not sufficiently satisfied leads to human poverty. And poverty generates pathologies, individual and collective pathologies. Some examples are: poverty of living (due to insufficient shelter); of protection (due to poor health systems); of affection (due to authoritarian systems); of understanding (as a result of poor quality of education); of participation (as a result of marginalization of women, children and minorities); and of identity (due to forced migration). Understanding these collective pathologies requires transdisciplinary research and action.

== Matrix of needs and satisfiers ==
The matrix is aimed at examining needs and satisfiers for development (Human Scale Development). Satisfiers are included in the matrix, at the intersection of existential needs (related to human existence) and axiological needs (related to human values). Max-Neef stressed that the set of needs described in this matrix is not absolute or complete, but simply an example that may be useful for analysis. When this matrix of satisfiers is created by individuals or groups from different cultures and at different times in history, it can differ considerably.

| Matrix of needs and satisfiers | | Existential needs | | | |
| Matrix of needs and satisfiers | | Being | Having | Doing | Interacting |
|---|---|---|---|---|---|
| Axiological needs | Subsistence | physical health, mental health, equilibrium, adaptability | food, shelter, work | feed, procreate, rest, work | living environment, social setting |
| Axiological needs | Protection | care, adaptability, autonomy, equilibrium, solidarity | insurance systems, savings, social security, health systems, rights, family, work | cooperate, prevent, plan, take care of, cure, help | living space, social environment, dwelling |
| Axiological needs | Affection | self-esteem, solidarity, respect, tolerance, generosity, receptiveness, passion, determination, sensuality | friendships, family, partnerships, pets, relationships with nature | make love, caress, express emotions, share, take care of, cultivate, appreciate | privacy, intimacy, home, space of togetherness |
| Axiological needs | Understanding | critical conscience, receptiveness, curiosity, astonishment, discipline, intuition, rationality | literature, teachers, method, educational policies, communication policies | investigate, study, experiment, educate, analyze, meditate | settings of formative interaction, schools, universities, academies, groups, communities, family |
| Axiological needs | Participation | adaptability, receptiveness, solidarity, willingness, determination, dedication, respect, passion | rights, responsibilities, duties, privileges, work | become affiliated, cooperate, propose, share, dissent, obey, interact, agree on, express opinions | settings of participative interaction, parties, associations, churches, communities, neighbourhoods, family |
| Axiological needs | Idleness | curiosity, receptiveness, imagination, recklessness, sense of humour, tranquility, sensuality | games, spectacles, clubs, parties, peace of mind | daydream, brood, dream, recall old times, give way to fantasies, remember, relax, have fun, play | privacy, intimacy, spaces of closeness, free time, surroundings, landscapes |
| Axiological needs | Creation | passion, determination, intuition, imagination, boldness, rationality, autonomy, inventiveness, curiosity | abilities, skills, method, work | work, invent, build, design, compose, interpret | productive and feedback settings, workshops, cultural groups, audiences, spaces for expression, temporal freedom |
| Axiological needs | Identity | sense of belonging, consistency, differentiation, self-esteem, assertiveness | symbols, language, religion, habits, customs, reference groups, sexuality, values, norms, historical memory, work | commit oneself, integrate oneself, confront, decide on, get to know oneself, recognize oneself, actualize oneself, grow | social rhythms, everyday settings, settings which one belongs to, maturation stages |
| Axiological needs | Freedom | autonomy, self-esteem, determination, passion, assertiveness, open-mindedness, boldness, rebelliousness, tolerance | equal rights | dissent, choose, be different from, run risks, develop awareness, commit oneself, disobey | temporal/spatial plasticity |

The satisfiers in the Being column are individual and collective attributes that can be expressed as nouns. The satisfiers in the Having column are institutions, norms, mechanisms, tools (not in the material sense), laws, etc. The satisfiers in the Doing column are individual or collective actions that can be expressed as verbs. The satisfiers in the Interacting column (Estar in Spanish, Befinden in German) (Note: There is no corresponding word for Estar in English, Interacting was considered to come closest to the intended meaning (according page 33 of the book).) are locations and environments.

== Characteristics of satisfiers ==
If we take a look at satisfiers for the needs of the community, a distinction can be made between exogenous and endogenous satisfiers.

Endogenous satisfiers arise from actions of the community at the basic level ('synergistic satisfiers'). They are anti-authoritarian and may contribute to Human Scale Development. Even though in some cases they are part from processes that are propagated by the state. For example, self-managed production satisfies the need for subsistence, but also is helpful in the needs of understanding, participation and creation.

Exogenous satisfiers are usually imposed, induced, ritualized or institutionalized. They arise at the top (in the sense of a political group or traditional power-holders) and are imposed on everyone, and prevent Human Scale Development. There are several categories of exogenous satisfiers.

- They derive from coercion ('violators'). They destroy in the long term the possibility to satisfy this need in this way. They also prevent the possibility of satisfying other needs. They lead to deviant human behavior. Failure to comply with such satisfiers leads to fear. For example arms race and bureaucracy. But also censorship, for satisfying the need for protection, but for preventing satisfying the needs of understanding, participation and freedom. Freedom of speech may be better in satisfying the need for protection, in the longer term.
- They derive from advertising or propaganda ('pseudo-satisfiers'). May satisfy a need for a time, but make it less likely to meet the need in the future. For example, people like status symbols, fashion trends, and chauvinistic ideas and stereotypes. But also indoctrination, where it may be better to provide (as neutral as possible) information.
- They derive from deep-rooted habits and practices ('inhibiting satisfiers'). Inhibiting satisfiers over-satisfy a particular need so that other needs go unmet. For example, paternalism and authoritarian education may over-satisfy the need for protection while the need for understanding and freedom go unmet.
- They derive from initiatives of institutions from the private sector or the government ('singular satisfiers'). For example, sporting events and organized tourist trips satisfy the need for idleness but not other needs.

== Publications of the work ==
The first publication of the work was in 1986 in a (Spanish-language) article in the journal of the Dag Hammarskjöld Foundation, Development Dialogue. This document stems from the work carried out in different countries in Latin America by a team of researchers, which is essentially transdisciplinary in nature. The authors of the work are Manfred Max-Neef, the Chilean sociologist Antonio Elizalde and Chilean philosopher Martin Hopenhayn, in collaboration with Felipe Herrera, Hugo Zemelman, Jorge Jatoba and Luis Weinstein. It was carried out in 1985 and 1986 with the assistance of professionals from Chile, Uruguay, Bolivia, Colombia, Mexico, Brazil, Canada and Sweden. Their expertise consisted of academic disciplines such as economics, sociology, psychiatry, philosophy, political science, geography, anthropology, journalism, technology and law. The participants formed a stable core group that guaranteed continuity in the processes of collective research and reflection during the project. The discussions of the workshops and the working documents drawn up by the participants form the basis of this document. Eventually it was discussed during a seminar at the Dag Hammarskjöld Center in Uppsala. The English translation of the article, expanded with "A Note on Methodology", was published in Development Dialogue in 1989.

As a book, it was published as an English-language version in 1991, (Note: Only one edition has been published. The main way for distributing this work was in the beginning by photocopying (according to the foreword of the book); and nowadays by downloading from the internet.) and as a Spanish-language version in 1993. (Note: This book is still being published.) In the books 2 adaptations of earlier articles by Max-Neef are added.

== Human scale development ==
Human scale development is a response to the neoliberalist and structuralist hierarchical development systems in which decisions are made at the top and are directed downwards instead of democratic decisions. It focuses on development by the people and for the people and is founded upon three pillars: fundamental human needs, increasing self-reliance and a balanced interdependence of people with their environment.

This system of development gives people a platform for community organizing and democratic decision making to empower people to take part in the planning process to ensure it meets their needs. The fundamental human needs of Max-Neef form the basis of this alternative development system. Unlike Maslow's hierarchy of needs, which focuses on a hierarchy of psychological needs, Max-Neef talks about needs that are complementary, all of which are necessary to achieve satisfaction. This proposal for an improved development system can certainly be useful on a small scale and also provides insight into the satisfaction of fundamental human needs by social institutions.

== Application ==
One of the applications of the work is in the field of Strategic Sustainable Development, where the fundamental human needs (not the marketed or created desires and wants) are used in the Brundtland definition. Together with other aspects of The Natural Step framework for Strategic Sustainable Development, summarized as back-casting of sustainability principles, it enables planning and designing for sustainability. Recent research builds on the work of Manfred Max-Neef.

== See also ==
- Maslow's hierarchy of needs
