= Manfred Max-Neef =

Chilean economist (1932–2019)

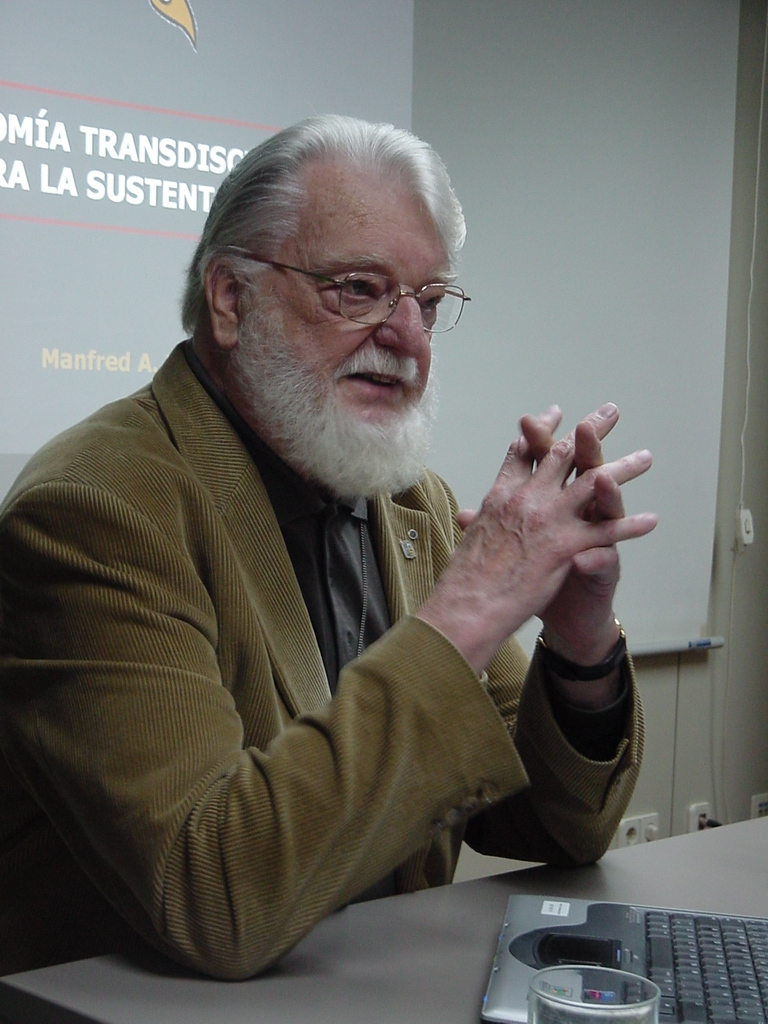
- Manfred Max-Neef, in 2007
- Born: Artur Manfred Max Neef; 26 October 1932; Valparaíso, Chile
- Died: 8 August 2019 (aged 86); Valdivia, Chile
- Education: University of Chile
- Awards: Right Livelihood Award
- Scientific career
- Fields: Economics
- Workplaces: University of California, Berkeley

Artur Manfred Max Neef (Spanish pronunciation: [ˈmaɱfɾeð maks]; 26 October 1932 – 8 August 2019) was a Chilean economist of German descent. Max-Neef was born in Valparaíso, Chile. He started his career as a professor of economics at the University of California, Berkeley in the early 1960s. He was known for his taxonomy of fundamental human needs and human scale development. In 1983, he was awarded the Right Livelihood Award for "revitalising small and medium-sized communities through 'Barefoot Economics'."

== Early life ==
Max-Neef was born on 26 October 1932 in Valparaíso, Chile, the son of Magdalena Sophie Neef, a humanities and music student, and Alfred Wilhelm Hermann Max, an economist. Both Max-Neef's parents had emigrated to Chile from Germany following World War I. Max-Neef studied at the Liceo de Aplicación in Santiago before going on to graduate with a degree in economics from the University of Chile.

== Career ==
Max-Neef traveled through Latin America and the United States, as a visiting professor in various universities, as well as living with and researching the poor. Due to the 1973 military coup in Chile, he sought refuge in Argentina, Canada, the United States, and Europe. He worked with the problem of development in the Third World, describing the inappropriateness of conventional models of development that have contributed to poverty, debt and ecological disasters for Third World communities.

"I was one day in an Indian village in the Sierra in Peru. It was an ugly day. It had been raining all the time. And I was standing in the slum. And across me, another guy also standing in the mud — not in the slum, in the mud. And, well, we looked at each other, and this was a short guy, thin, hungry, jobless, five kids, a wife and a grandmother. And I was the fine economist from Berkeley, teaching in Berkeley, having taught in Berkeley and so on. And we were looking at each other, and then suddenly I realized that I had nothing coherent to say to that man in those circumstances, that my whole language as an economist, you know, was absolutely useless. Should I tell him that he should be happy because the GDP had grown five percent or something? Everything was absurd."

In 1981, Max-Neef wrote From the Outside Looking In: Experiences in Barefoot Economics, a narrative of his travels among the poor in South America. In the same year, he founded the Centre for Development Alternatives (CEPAUR). In 1983, Max-Neef won the Right Livelihood Award for his work in poverty-stricken areas of developing countries. He ran for President of Chile as an independent in the 1993 election, achieving 4th place with 5.7% of the vote.

In 1993, Max-Neef was appointed rector of the Universidad Austral de Chile in Valdivia where he taught for 25 years. He is also affiliated with the European Academy of Sciences and Arts, the Club of Rome, the New York Academy of Sciences, and the Leopold Kohr Academy of Salzburg (an institution founded by Leopold Kohr).

Among his honoraria were Chile's National Prize for the Promotion and Defense of Human Rights and the Kenneth Boulding Award, the highest honour bestowed by the International Society for Ecological Economics. He was also a council member of the World Future Council.

== Bibliography ==
- Max-Neef, Manfred A (1992). From the Outside Looking In: Experiences in Barefoot Economics (PDF). Dag Hammarskjöld Foundation. p. 208. ISBN 1-85649-188-9. Archived from the original on 21 October 2012.
- Max-Neef, Manfred A; Antonio Elizalde; Martin Hopenhayn (1991). Human Scale Development (PDF). The Apex Press. p. 114. ISBN 0-945257-35-X. Archived from the original on 19 March 2013.
- Max-Neef, Manfred A; Paul Ekins (1992). Real-Life Economics: Understanding Wealth Creation. Routledge. p. 432. ISBN 0-415-07976-4. Archived from the original on 6 October 2011.
