= Setting up to fail =

Form of workplace bullying and no-win situation

"Setting up to fail" is a phrase denoting a no-win situation designed in such a way that the person in the situation cannot succeed at the task which they have been assigned. It is considered a form of workplace bullying. There are also situations in which an organization or project is set up to fail, and where individuals set themselves up to fail. The first known documented use of "set up to fail" was in 1969 in the United States.

== In the workplace ==
Setting up to fail is a well-established workplace bullying tactic. One technique is to overload with work, while denying the victim the authority to handle it and over-interfering; another is the withholding of the information necessary to succeed.

If a person puts another individual (usually a subordinate) in a stressful situation in which failure is almost certain, this may be an aspect of bullying wherein the outcome can then be used to discredit and blame the victim. Sometimes, this may involve the bully covertly sabotaging and undermining an objective that may have otherwise been achievable. This type of bullying may be the result of the projection of the bully's own feelings of inadequacy onto the victim.

There can be cases where an employee is set up to fail because the stated goals of the task are considered harmful to the organization; an internal investigation is one example. Institutions may protect themselves by "going through the motions" of a sham investigation in which the findings conveniently fail to find any evidence of wrongdoing by the authorities involved with setting up the investigation.

Another case where employees are set up to fail is one in which new employees, or redundant employees, are considered harmful or a threat to other employees, resulting in their efforts to sabotage others' work to maintain their positions if a future reduction in force is anticipated.

== Bigotry ==
Minorities seeking positions in society often feel they have been set up to fail in the face of covert institutional racism or sexism – something feared for example by the first Black US naval officers.

== Families ==
Parents may have excessive expectations for their children's academic success for instance, thus setting them up for failure by hoping they may solve their parents' problems for them. The result may be to create a self-destructive syndrome in the child – the so-called Divine Child complex.

== Therapy ==
Therapy may be sabotaged by either the client or the provider. The client, both hoping for and fearing the possibility of real help, may impose conditions on the therapy that all but guarantee its failure. Conversely, the helper, needing to keep clients in a state of dependency, may be threatened by the prospect of success/closure, and undermine the therapy accordingly.

== Setting oneself up to fail ==
A person setting themselves up for failure may do so because they have a fear of failure, an unrealistic assessment of their own abilities, or because they are naive and uninformed regarding the abilities necessary to succeed. In some cases, an individual has an unjustified expectation that they will fail, a self-reinforcing negative spiral, or failure neurosis – perhaps driven by a sense of guilt, or by the compulsion to repeat self-destructive behavior.

== In television ==
It is a tactic used in reality television, where situations are engineered to produce certain results. My Kitchen Rules contestant Emily Cheung told the reporter that "she believes the producers set them up for failure in the instant restaurant round when they were told at 6 o'clock the night before they had to cook a Chinese dish they weren't familiar with—smoked quail—and scored 2 out of 10". The same article goes on to state that, "A former Apprentice contestant feels similarly manipulated, saying he believed producers had already decided who they wanted to win when he was eliminated."

== 9/11 Commission ==
9/11 Commission member Lee H. Hamilton was quoted as saying that "the Commission was set up to fail"; some observers interpreted this as meaning that he was dissatisfied with the results of the 9/11 Commission Report, and conspiracy theories developed. The context of the interview transcript indicates that Hamilton said his reasoning was that "Tom Kean and I were substitutes—Henry Kissinger and George Mitchell were the first choices; we got started late; we had a very short time frame—indeed, we had to get it extended; we did not have enough money—3 million dollars to conduct an extensive investigation. We needed more, we got more, but it took us a while to get it."

== See also ==
- Abilene paradox
- Double bind
- Jonah complex
- Moving the goalposts
- Planned obsolescence
- Self-sabotage
- Social undermining
