= Metamotivation =

Psychology concept

Metamotivation is a term coined by Abraham Maslow to describe the motivation of people who are self-actualized and striving beyond the scope of their basic needs to reach their full potential. Maslow suggested that people are initially motivated by a series of basic needs, called the hierarchy of needs. Maslow states, "Self-actualizing people are gratified in all their basic needs (of belongingness, affection, respect, and self-esteem)". Once a person has successfully navigated the hierarchy of needs thus satisfying all their basic needs, Maslow proposed they then travel "a path called growth motivation".

Maslow believed that a distinction must be made between the motives of those who operate at or below the level of self-actualization (ones still striving for their basic needs, or ones who have met their basic needs but still live without purpose), and those who are self-actualized who are also with significant purpose, as their motivations differ significantly. Deficiency needs (drives or D-needs) motivate people to satisfy physiological needs such as hunger, sex, love, whereas being needs (B-needs) propel a person beyond self-actualization and drive them to fulfill their inherent ultimate potential.

== In Maslow's view ==
Maslow had an optimistic and humanistic view of humanity. He regarded people's innate drive towards self-actualization beneficial to society as a whole. In Maslow's view, once people's basic needs were met, they were free to explore their abilities and strive to further develop those innate abilities. Driven by Metamotivation, people are more spontaneous, free to be themselves, and explore their ultimate potential to create a fulfilled life.

Not all people that satisfy their basic needs automatically become driven by B-needs. In his landmark book, Farther Reaches of Human Nature, Maslow stated that people who are self-actualizing and driven by metamotivation "are dedicated people, devoted to some task 'outside themselves,' some vocation, or duty, or beloved job". Maslow goes on to say that such a calling could be construed as a destiny or fate and that such people are particularly talented in their field and could be called naturals.

== Metaneeds and metapathology ==
Metamotivation is what motivates and impels an individual toward self-actualization and excellence. Metamotivation is distinct from motivation operating in the lower level needs, and it emerges after the lower needs are satisfied. These lower motivations, which Maslow calls "deficiency motivations" or D-Motivations, are described as the type of motivation that operates on the lower four levels of his hierarchy of needs. These deficiency motivations are drives that arise when a physiological or psychological deficit is perceived, leading toward actions to alleviate tension and restore equilibrium.

Maslow describes a metaneed as any need for knowledge, beauty, or creativity. Metaneeds are involved in self-actualization and constitute the highest level of needs, coming into play primarily after the lower level needs have been met. In Maslow's hierarchy, metaneeds are associated with impulses for self-actualization.

Maslow's list of Metaneeds:

1. Wholeness (unity)
2. Perfection (balance and harmony)
3. Completion (ending)
4. Justice (fairness)
5. Richness (complexity)
6. Simplicity (essence)
7. Liveliness (spontaneity)
8. Beauty (rightness of form)
9. Goodness (benevolence)
10. Uniqueness (individuality)
11. Playfulness (ease)
12. Truth (reality)
13. Autonomy (self-sufficiency)
14. Meaningfulness (values)

Metapathology is the thwarting of self-development related to failure to satisfy the metaneeds. Metapathology prevents self-actualizers from expressing, using and fulfilling their potential. Reasons people may not become self-actualized include: poor childhoods, lower economic conditions, inadequate education, anxieties and fears, and the Jonah complex.

== See also ==
- Peak experiences
- Positive disintegration
- Self-actualization
- Self-esteem
- Law of the instrument
- Humanistic psychology
- Human Potential Movement
- Alfred Adler
- Carl Rogers
- Henry Murray
- Viktor Frankl
