= Healthy Food Financing Initiative =

US government initiative

The Healthy Food Financing Initiative (HFFI) is a program created in 2010 by the Obama administration as part of the Let's Move! public health campaign. It is a partnership between the Department of Health and Human Services, the Treasury Department, and the Department of Agriculture, which seeks to address inequality in food access, and encourage the growth of food retailers such as grocery stores and farmer's markets in so-called food deserts, where there is limited availability of healthy food options, and a community over-reliance on fast food and convenience stores. To address this, the program provides "financing to grocers or real estate developers seeking to open or expand stores in areas without adequate access to affordable, nutritious foods."

As of 2018 the program has awarded $220 million in grants and assistance, leveraged approximately $1 billion through private investment and other sources, and supported approximately 1,000 businesses in 35 states.

HFFI is modeled after a similar project, the New York Fresh Food Financing Initiative (NY FFFI). PA FFFI was founded in 2004, and as of 2010 had opened around 80 stores providing access to food for around 400,000 people, as well supporting approximately 4,800 related job.

Previous studies of the effectiveness of such a program have had mixed results, but also suffered from small sample sizes. One 2015 study found overall negative effects on diet, and no improvement for "fruit and vegetable intake, whole grain consumption or body mass index" and ultimately recommended further study.

On February 14, 2018, House Bill 5017 was introduced by Ohio Representative Marcia Fudge to reauthorize HFFI.

== See also ==
- Food security
- Geography of food
- Nutritional anthropology
