= Reverence (emotion) =

Attitude of deep respect tinged with awe

Reverence is "a feeling or attitude of deep respect tinged with awe; veneration". Reverence involves a humbling of the self in respectful recognition of something perceived to be greater than the self.

The word "reverence" is often used in relationship with religion. This is because religion often stimulates this emotion through recognition of a god, the supernatural, and the ineffable. Like awe, it is an emotion in its own right, and can be felt outside of the realm of religion.

Whereas awe may be characterized as an overwhelming "sensitivity to greatness," reverence is seen more as "acknowledging a subjective response to something excellent in a personal (moral or spiritual) way, but qualitatively above oneself". Robert C. Solomon describes awe as passive, but reverence as active, noting that the feeling of awe (i.e., becoming awestruck) implies paralysis, whereas feelings of reverence are associated more with active engagement and responsibility toward that which one reveres.

Nature, science, literature, philosophy, great philosophers, leaders, artists, art, music, wisdom, and beauty may each act as the stimulus and focus of reverence.

== Theorists ==
=== Paul Woodruff ===
In his book "Reverence: Renewing a Forgotten Virtue," Paul Woodruff explores the contemporary concept of reverence. He notes that both modern society and its discussions about ancient cultures in which reverence was prized, such as Greece and China, often lack a genuine understanding of reverence. Woodruff defines reverence as the ability to feel awe directed at the transcendent, respect for others, and shame over one's own faults, when these emotions are appropriate. This definition encompasses respect, shame, and aspects. While recognizing the connection between reverence and religion, Woodruff argues that politics plays a significant role in this virtue. His goal in the book is to dispel the common misconception that reverent emotions are exclusively tied to religion.

According to Woodruff, meaningful human life relies on ceremony and ritual, but "[w]ithout reverence, rituals are empty". These ceremonial practices occur in various settings, including homes, meetings, voting, and religious contexts, shaping the backdrop for experiencing reverence. Because these are banal and commonplace, the emotion of reverence often fades without us noticing. Woodruff contends that in a functioning society, reverence, ceremony, and respect remain indispensable even though their significance may go unnoticed. He clarifies that it's not reverence itself but rather the concept of reverence that is absent. Woodruff hopes for a renewed recognition of reverence in society.

Woodruff asserts that true reverence pertains to aspects beyond human influence: the "ideal of unity," which transcends political concerns. The object of reverence may vary, encompassing God, unity, or anything surpassing human capabilities. Woodruff emphasizes that reverence values truth itself more than any human creation that attempts to represent truth. Furthermore, he posits that the primary focus of reverence is something that serves as a reminder of human limitations.

Woodruff highlights the role of music, asserting that "[r]everence cannot be expressed in a creed; its most apt expression is in music". He illustrates this idea through an analogy involving a quartet with varying skill levels performing a Mozart piece. In this scenario, reverence arises because:

1. The musicians collaborate harmoniously on a shared project
2. Their endeavor involves a sense of ceremony
3. They transcend personal ego during the performance
4. They function within a well-defined hierarchy that is agreeable to all
5. They collectively experience a sense of "inarticulate awe"

Woodruff believes "[a]rt speaks the language of reverence better than philosophy does" and connects most fluently with preexisting reverential instincts.

In the presence of death, says Woodruff, an expectation of reverence is natural, though its expression is culturally-variant. Religions come and go, but cultural expressions of reverence are constant. "You need not believe in God to be reverent, but to develop an occasion for reverence you must share a culture with others, and this must support a degree of ceremony." Religion is not required to provoke reverence, but rather religion depends on the emotion of reverence.

Paul Woodruff examines the historical significance of reverence as a virtue. In both Ancient Greek and Chinese civilizations, reverence was a force that upheld social order and harmony. In Greek culture, reverence had roots in a myth crafted by Protagoras in which Zeus bestowed reverence and justice upon humanity so that society would survive. In classical Greek society, as illustrated in its surviving literature, reverence served as a motivating force, encouraging people to act justly and humbly to contribute to societal improvement. The feeling of awe toward what transcends humanity helps people better respect one another.

After examining classical Greek culture, Woodruff turns his attention to classical Chinese Confucian society, particularly the Analects, where he finds filial piety to express reverence in the family context. He highlights the significance of the concept of "li", which also encompasses civility and reverence. There's a parallel between Greek and Chinese societies in that in both, notions of reverence flourished as polytheism gave way to agnosticism. In these changing circumstances, reverence endures and prospers because it addresses fundamental aspects of human life—family, hierarchy, and mortality. Woodruff argues that deviating from tradition does not necessarily imply irreverence, and he critiques relativism, advocating instead that people critically evaluate all cultures and forms of reverence.

=== Abraham Maslow ===
Abraham Maslow in his Religions, Values, and Peak Experiences, deals extensively with reverence. Reverence is an ingredient in what he terms a peak experience, which is crucial to having a fulfilling life. Maslow states that "wonder, awe, reverence, humility, surrender, and even worship before the greatness of the experience are often reported" in peak experiences. Religion is a possible, but not a necessary context for this. Indeed, religion can unfortunately sequester reverence: "'Religionizing' only one part of life secularizes the rest of it". Maslow contends that religion seeks to access reverence through ritual, but that the familiarity of the ritual can deaden any reverent feelings.

=== Albert Schweitzer ===
Albert Schweitzer sought for years for the basis of a new worldview. One day, while in a boat on the river in Gabon, it struck him with great force and clarity: "Reverence for Life" (In German: Ehrfurcht vor dem Leben).

== Empirical studies ==
=== Patient recovery ===
Empirical studies on reverence are scarce. One intriguing study examined a "sense of reverence in religious and secular contexts" in 177 patients following a coronary artery bypass. The researchers sought to find if religious forms of reverence practiced through faith and prayer yielded similar results to secular forms of reverence in patient recovery. "Because reverence includes an affective as well as a cognitive component, we see it as a form of positive feeling/emotion associated with injection of the sacred into various worldviews." Such positive emotions were believed to help in patient recovery. They found that traditional religious involvement improved health outcomes, and secular reverence reduced the likelihood of postoperative complications, but that "[r]eligious reverence did not have the same beneficial effect as secular reverence on bypass recovery". They inferred that reverence "seems to enhance recovery following bypass".

=== Awe ===
Keltner and Haidt studied the importance of vastness and accommodation in experiencing awe. "Vastness refers to anything that is experienced as being much larger than the self"; accommodation means "adjusting mental structures that cannot assimilate a new experience". Their research how awe is experienced through moral, spiritual, and aesthetic means, helps us understand reverence. Their study includes a survey of previous literature about awe "in religion, philosophy, sociology, and psychology" and "[r]elated states such as admiration, elevation, and the epiphanic experience".

Haidt notes that since Maslow studied peak experiences, little empirical research has been done to examine such experiences and the moral transformations associated with emotions such as gratitude, elevation, awe, admiration, and reverence. Haidt's own work in these areas suggests that potent feelings of reverence may be associated with the peak experiences accompanying moral transformation which "seem to push a mental ‘reset button,’ wiping out feelings of cynicism and replacing them with feelings of hope, love, and optimism, and a sense of moral inspiration".

=== Art ===
Great artists sometimes give concrete form to culturally derived beliefs, values, and group identities that propose profound meaning and purpose. Reverence for artworks that instantiate such central aspects of culture can buffer the existential anxiety that follows from reminders of the inevitability of human mortality. Across history, cultures have revered art as a "forum for representing in an enduring medium those individuals who are held up as embodiments of virtue and lasting significance".

=== Transpersonality ===
From the standpoint of experiential personal construct psychology (EPCP), Thomas and Schlutsmeyer suggest that "[r]everence felt in meaningful interpersonal connectedness is one starting point for the development of a larger sense of connection with the world and the many others (human and nonhuman) in it". They call this "transpersonal reverence" and make a case for the role of reverence as "a goal of therapy, a sign of optimal functioning". They believe a therapist must revere the patient and the patient must learn to revere others and themselves in order for the therapy to be effective.

== Religion and music ==
David Pugmire's article, "The Secular Reception of Religious Music" explores the experience of reverence through music. In particular he looks at how religious music has the capacity to instill emotions of reverence, awe, wonder, and veneration in secular people who lack the context to understand the transcendent through the religion associated with the music. "Sacred music seems to have a surprising power over unbelievers not just to quicken or delight them as other music does, but also to ply them, as little else can, with what might be called devotional feelings". Even with this though, Pugmire argues that the secularist cannot fully comprehend the nature of sacred art including sacred music. "Its undoubted expressiveness can lead him at most to excesses of feeling, not to emotion in the fullest sense, i.e., emotion with appropriate objects sustained by appropriate judgments".

Pugmire believes that reverence belongs to the range of emotions that can be classified in their devotional or sacred forms, "Emotions of reverence, solemnity, agape, hope, serenity, and ecstasy". But this classification of emotions poses an interesting question: can any emotion be purely religious? "A central candidate for a distinctively religious emotion would be reverence". But it is not entirely distinct from emotions that are not related to transcendence or religion. "Reverence is indeed graver, and an attitude in which one is more given over, than its secular approximations in the shape of approval or esteem or respect". But this does not make it purely religious. Immanuel Kant "was able to claim reverence as our principal moral emotion without invoking any grounding theological basis for this". "Similarly for its bracing sibling, awe: it figures in our experience of the sublime, of which Kant purports to find an entirely secular account." To connect the secular and the sacred emotions Pugmire looks at the emotions which can be experienced equally in both contexts. These are "Love, humility, sorrow, pity, joy, serenity, ecstasy". Pugmire then suggests that devotional emotion is "The transfiguring of mundane emotion into what one might call emotion of the last instance, to the reception and expression of which religious imagery is especially well-suited, and not accidentally". The emotion of the last instance refers to the capacity of the emotional imagination to lose the sense of self and engage in the infinite and the ineffable. Pugmire suggests that religion "Provides a strikingly apt vocabulary for the expression of emotion of the last instance". Reverence is perhaps the most critical of these "emotions of the last instance" and can be adequately accessed through religious music.

== See also ==
- In Memoriam by Tennyson
- Deference
- Emotion
  - Moral emotions
  - Social emotions
