= Post-traumatic growth =

Psychological term

In psychology, post-traumatic growth (PTG) is positive psychological change experienced as a result of struggling with highly challenging, highly stressful life circumstances. These circumstances represent significant challenges to the adaptive resources of the individual, and pose significant challenges to the individual's way of understanding the world and their place in it. Post-traumatic growth involves "life-changing" psychological shifts in thinking and relating to the world and the self, that contribute to a personal process of change, that is deeply meaningful.

Individuals who experience post-traumatic growth often report changes across the following five areas: appreciation of life; relating to others; personal strength; new possibilities; and spiritual, existential or philosophical change.

These changes allow these individuals to give meaning to their traumatic experience in order to better understand themselves, allowing them to appreciate all aspects of their lives, stronger relationships allow them to increase empathy while personal strength becomes resilience as well and spiritual experiences or philosophy help them incorporate new core beliefs. These five areas allow these individuals to grow and find meaning in different but interconnecting sources.

== Global context and history ==
The general understanding that suffering and distress can potentially yield positive change is thousands of years old. For example, some of the early ideas and writing of the ancient Hebrews, Greeks, and early Christians, as well as some of the teachings of Hinduism, Buddhism, Islam and the Baháʼí Faith contain elements of the potentially transformative power of suffering. Attempts to understand and discover the meaning of human suffering represent a central theme of much philosophical inquiry and appear in the works of novelists, dramatists and poets.

Traditional psychology's equivalent to thriving is psychological resilience, which is reaching the previous level of functioning before a trauma, stressor, or challenge. The difference between resilience and thriving is the recovery point – thriving goes above and beyond resilience, and involves finding benefits within challenges.

The term "post-traumatic growth" was coined by psychologists Richard Tedeschi and Lawrence Calhoun at the University of North Carolina at Charlotte. According to Tedeschi, as many as 89% of survivors report at least one aspect of post-traumatic growth, such as a renewed appreciation for life.

Variants of the idea have included Crystal Park's proposed stress related growth model, which highlighted the derived sense of meaning in the context of adjusting to challenging and stressful situations, and Joseph and Linley's proposed adversarial growth model, which linked growth with psychological wellbeing. According to the adversarial growth model, whenever an individual is experiencing a challenging situation, they can either integrate the traumatic experience into their current belief system and worldviews or they can modify their beliefs based on their current experiences. If the individual positively accommodates the trauma-related information and assimilates prior beliefs, psychological growth can occur following adversity.

== Development of post-traumatic growth ==
=== Relationship between trauma, PTG, and other outcomes ===
Psychological trauma is an emotional response caused by severe distressing events that are outside the normal range of human experiences. While the idea that positive change may occur following trauma may seem paradoxical, it is common and well documented. However, not everyone who experiences a traumatic event will necessarily develop post-traumatic growth. This is because growth does not occur as a direct result of trauma; rather, it is the individual's struggle with the new reality in the aftermath of trauma that is crucial in determining the extent to which post-traumatic growth occurs.

While PTG often leads individuals to live in ways that are fulfilling and meaningful, the presence of PTG and distress are not mutually exclusive. Experiencing trauma is typically associated with distress and loss, and PTG does not change this. PTG and negative trauma related outcomes (e.g. PTSD) often coexist. Encouragingly, reports of growth experiences in the aftermath of traumatic events far outnumber reports of psychiatric disorders.

=== Creating post-traumatic growth ===
Post-traumatic growth occurs with the attempts to adapt to highly negative sets of circumstances that can engender high levels of psychological distress such as major life crises, which typically engender unpleasant psychological reactions. Such experiences often alter or renew one's core relationships or concepts, leading to PTG.

==== A model of PTG ====
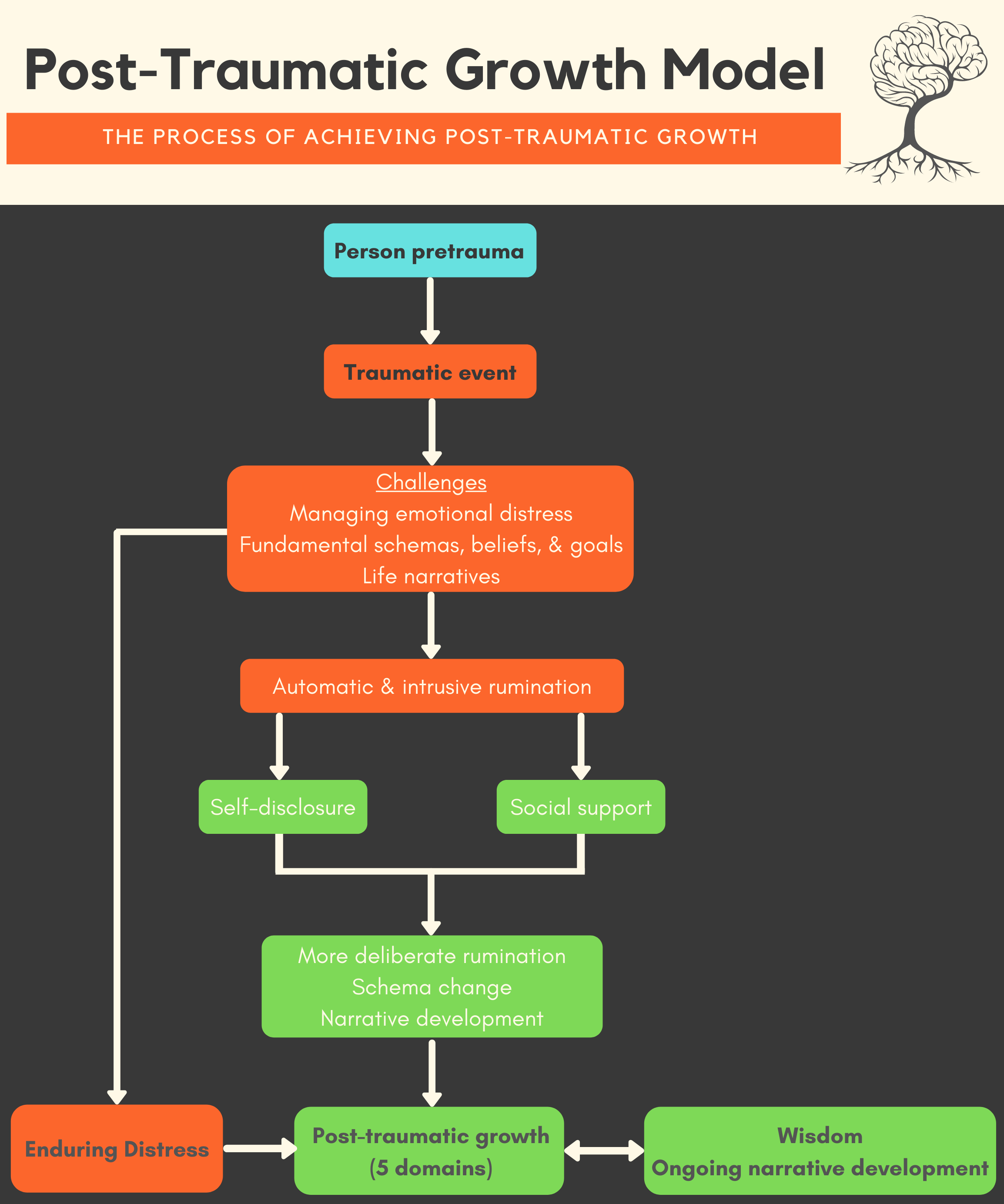
A model of post-traumatic growth

Calhoun and Tedeschi (2006) outline their updated model of post-traumatic growth in Handbook of Post-traumatic Growth: Research and Practice. Most importantly, this model includes:

- Characteristics of the Person and of the Challenging Circumstances
- Management of Emotional Distress
- Rumination
- Self-Disclosure
- Sociocultural Influences
- Narrative Development
- Life Wisdom

==== Promotive factors ====
Various factors have been identified as associated the development of PTG. In 2011 Iversen and Christiansen and Elklit suggested that predictors of growth have different effects on PTG on micro-, meso-, and macro level, and a positive predictor of growth on one level can be a negative predictor of growth on another level. This might explain some of the inconsistent research results within the area.

Trauma types: Characteristics of the traumatic event may contribute to the development or inhibition of PTG. For example, for PTG to come about, the severity of the traumatic experience must be enough to threaten one's preexisting understanding the world or their personal narrative. However, extremely severe trauma exposure may overwhelm one's ability to comprehend and grow from the experience. Experiencing Multiple Sources of Trauma is also considered promotive of PTG. While gender roles did not reliably predict PTG, they are indicative of the type of trauma that an individual experiences. Women tend to experience victimization on a more individual and interpersonal level (e.g. sexual victimization) while men tend to experience more systemic and collective traumas (e.g. military and combat). Given that group dynamics appear to play a predictive role in post-traumatic growth, it can be argued that the type of exposure may indirectly predict growth in men (Lilly 2012).

Responding to the traumatic experience: The different ways in which a person may process or engage after a traumatic experience may influence whether PTG comes about. The presence of rumination, sharing negative emotions, positive coping strategies (e.g. spirituality), event centrality, resilience, and growth actions are associated with increased PTG.

Many individuals ruminate extensively about a traumatic experience after it has occurred. In this context, rumination is not necessarily negative and can mean the same thing as cognitive engagement. When this occurs, the individual is investing mental resources into understanding and making sense of their experience. People typically participate in this way to comprehend and explain their experience (Why? How?) and to discover how their experience factors into their perceptions and plans (What does this mean? What now?). While neither is entirely bad, deliberate rather than intrusive rumination can be the most effective at producing growth.

The use of different coping strategies to adjust to a stressor may also influence the development of PTG. As Richard G. Tedeschi and other post-traumatic growth researchers have found, the ability to accept situations that cannot be changed is crucial for adapting to traumatic life events. They call it "acceptance coping", and have determined that coming to terms with reality is a significant predictor of post-traumatic growth. It is also alleged, though currently under further investigation, that opportunity for emotional disclosure can lead to post-traumatic growth though did not significantly reduce post-traumatic stress symptomology.

The individual's characteristics: Some personality traits have been found to be associated with increased PTG. These traits include openness, agreeableness, altruistic behaviors, extraversion, conscientiousness, sense of coherence (SOC), sense of purpose, hopefulness, and low neuroticism are associated with PTG. Despite being otherwise undesirable, narcissism is also associated with PTG. These traits may increase an individual's capacity to adapt to traumas, leading to growth.

Social support: Social support has been found to be a mediator of PTG. Not only are high levels of pre-exposure social support associated with growth, but there is some neurobiological evidence to support the idea that support will modulate a pathological response to stress in the hypothalamic-pituitary-adrenocortical (HPA) pathway in the brain (Ozbay 2007). It also benefits a person to have supportive others that can aid in post-traumatic growth by providing a way to craft narratives about the changes that have occurred, and by offering perspectives that can be integrated into schema change. These relationships help develop narratives; narratives of trauma and survival are always important in post-traumatic growth because they forces survivors to confront questions of meaning and how answers to those questions can be reconstructed.

Religion and Spirituality: Spirituality has been shown to highly correlate with post-traumatic growth and in fact, many of the most deeply spiritual beliefs are a result of trauma exposure.

Other variables:

- Age: Post-traumatic growth has been studied in children to a lesser extent. A review by Meyerson and colleagues found various relations between social and psychological factors and post-traumatic growth in children and adolescents, but concluded that fundamental questions about its value and function remain.

== Interdisciplinary connections ==
=== Personality psychology and PTG ===
Historically, personality traits have been depicted as being stable following the age of 30. Since 1994, research findings suggested that personality traits can change in response to life transition events during middle and late adulthood. Life transition events may be related to work, relationships, or health. Moderate amounts of stress were associated with improvements in the traits of mastery and toughness. Individuals experiencing moderate amounts of stress were found to be more confident about their abilities and had a better sense of control over their lives. Further, moderate amounts of stress were also associated with better resilience, which can be defined as successful recovery to baseline following stress. An individual who experienced moderate amounts of stressful events was more likely to develop coping skills, seek support from their environment, and experience more confidence in their ability to overcome adversity.

==== Post-traumatic growth and personality psychology ====
Experiencing a traumatic event can have a transformational role in personality among certain individuals and facilitate growth. For example, individuals who have experienced trauma have been shown to exhibit greater optimism, positive affect, and satisfaction with social support, as well as increases in the number of social supportive resources. Similarly, research reveals personality changes among spouses of terminal cancer patients suggesting such traumatic life transitions facilitated increases in interpersonal orientation, prosocial behaviors, and dependability scores.

The outcome of traumatic events can be negatively impacted by factors occurring during and after the trauma, potentially increasing the risk of developing post-traumatic stress disorder, or other mental health difficulties.

Further, characteristics of the trauma and personality dynamics of the individual experiencing the trauma each independently contributed to post-traumatic growth. If the amounts of stress are too low or too overwhelming, a person cannot cope with the situation. Personality dynamics can either facilitate or impede post-traumatic growth, regardless of the impact of traumatic events.

==== Mixed findings in personality psychology ====
Research of post-traumatic growth is emerging in the field of personality psychology, with mixed findings. Several researchers examined post-traumatic growth and its associations with the big five personality model. Post-traumatic growth was found to be associated with greater agreeableness, openness, and extraversion. Agreeableness relates to interpersonal behaviors which include trust, altruism, compliance, honesty, and modesty. Individuals who are agreeable are more likely to seek support when needed and to receive it from others. Higher scores on the agreeableness trait can facilitate the development of post-traumatic growth.

Individuals who score high on openness scales are more likely to be curious, open to new experiences, and emotionally responsive to their surroundings. It is hypothesized that following a traumatic event, individuals who score high on openness would more readily reconsider their beliefs and values that may have been altered. Openness to experiences is thus key for facilitating post-traumatic growth. Individuals who score high on extraversion were more likely to adopt more problem-solving strategies, cognitive restructuring, and seek more support from others. Individuals who score high on extraversion use coping strategies that enable post-traumatic growth. Research among veterans and among children of prisoners of war suggested that openness and extraversion contributed to post-traumatic growth.

Research among community samples suggested that openness, agreeableness, and conscientiousness contributed to post-traumatic growth. Individuals who score high on conscientiousness tend to be better at self-regulating their internal experience, have better impulse control, and are more likely to seek achievements across various domains. The conscientiousness trait has been associated with better problem-solving and cognitive restructuring. As such, individuals who are conscientious are more likely to better adjust to stressors and exhibit post-traumatic growth.

Other research among bereaved caregivers and among undergraduates indicated that post-traumatic growth was associated with extraversion, agreeableness, and conscientiousness. As such, the findings linking the big five personality traits with post-traumatic growth are mixed.

==== Personality dynamics and trauma types ====
Recent research is examining the influence of trauma types and personality dynamics on post-traumatic growth. Individuals who aspire to standards and orderliness are more likely to develop post-traumatic growth and better overall mental health. It is hypothesized that such individuals can better process the meaning of hardships as they experience moderate amounts of stress. This tendency can facilitate positive personal growth. On the other hand, it was found that individuals who have trouble in regulating themselves are less likely to develop post-traumatic growth and more likely to develop trauma-spectrum disorders and mood disorders. This is in line with past research that suggested that individuals who scored higher on self-discrepancy were more likely to score higher on neuroticism and exhibit poor coping. Neuroticism relates to an individual's tendency to respond with negative emotions to threat, frustration, or loss. As such, individuals with high neuroticism and self-discrepancy are less likely to develop post-traumatic growth. Research has highlighted the important role that collective processing of emotional experiences has on post-traumatic growth. Those who are more capable of engaging with their emotional experiences due to crisis and trauma, and make meaning of these are more likely to increase in their resilience and community engagement following the disaster. Furthermore, collective processing of these emotional experiences leads to greater individual growth and collective solidarity and belongingness.

==== Personality characteristics ====
Two personality characteristics that may affect the likelihood that people can make positive use of the aftermath of traumatic events that befall them include extraversion and openness to experience. Also, optimists may be better able to focus attention and resources on the most important matters, and disengage from uncontrollable or unsolvable problems. The ability to grieve and gradually accept trauma could also increase the likelihood of growth.

Individual differences in coping strategies set some people on a maladaptive spiral, whereas others proceed on an adaptive spiral. With this in mind, some early success in coping could be a precursor to post-traumatic growth. A person's level of confidence could also play a role in her or his ability to persist into growth or, out of lack of confidence, give up.

=== Positive psychology and PTG ===
Post-traumatic growth can be seen as a form of positive psychology. In the 1990s, the field of psychology began a movement towards understanding positive psychological outcomes after trauma. Researchers initially referred to this phenomenon in number of different ways, "positive life changes", "growing in the aftermath of suffering", and "positive adaptation to trauma". But it was not until Tedeschi and Calhoun created the "Posttraumatic Growth Inventory (PTGI)" in 1996 in which the term post-traumatic growth (PTG) was born. Around the same time, a new area of strengths-based psychology emerged.

Positive psychology involves studying positive mental processes aimed at understanding positive psychological outcomes and "healthy" individuals. This framework was intended to serve as an answer to "mental illness" focused psychology. The core ideals of positive psychology are included, but not limited to:

- Positive personality traits (optimism, subjective well-being, happiness, self-determination)
- Authenticity
- Finding meaning and purpose (self-actualization)
- Spirituality
- Healthy interpersonal relationships
- Satisfaction with life
- Gratitude

The concept of PTG has been described as a part of the positive psychology movement. Since PTG describes positive outcomes post-trauma rather than negative outcomes, it falls under the category of positive psychological changes. Positive psychology intends to lay claim on all capacities of positive mental functioning. So, even though PTG (as a defined concept) was not initially described in the positive psychology framework, it is presently included in positive psychological theories. This is reinforced by the parallels between the core concepts of positive psychology and PTG. This is observable through comparing the 5 domains of the PTGI with the core ideals of positive psychology.

==== Positive psychology and domains of the PTGI ====
Positive psychological changes and outcomes are defined as a part of positive psychology. PTG is specifically the positive psychological changes post-trauma. The domains of PTG are defined as the different areas of positive psychological changes that are possible post-trauma. The PTGI, a measure designed by Tedeschi and Calhoun in 1996, measures PTG across the following areas or domains:

- New possibilities: The positive psychological changes described by the domain of "New Possibilities" are developing new interests, establishing a new path in life, doing better things with one's life, new opportunities, and an increased likelihood to change what is needed. This can be compared to the "finding meaning and purpose" core ideal of positive psychology.
- Relating to others: The positive psychological changes described by the domain "Relating to Others" are increased reliability on others in times of trouble, greater sense of closeness with others, willingness to express emotions to others, increased compassion for others, increased effort in relationships, greater appreciation of how wonderful people are, and increased acceptance about needing others. This can be compared to the "healthy interpersonal relationships" core ideal of positive psychology.
- Personal strength: The positive psychological changes described by the domain "Personal Strength" are a greater feeling of self-reliance, increased ability to handle difficulties, improved acceptance of life outcomes and new discovery of mental strength. This can be compared to the "positive personality traits (self-determination, optimism)" core ideals of positive psychology.
- Spiritual change: The positive psychological changes described by the domain "Spiritual Change" are a better understanding of spiritual matters and a stronger religious (or spiritual) faith. This can be compared to the "spirituality and authenticity" core ideal of positive psychology.
- Appreciation of life: The positive psychological changes described by the domain "Appreciation of Life" are changed priorities regarding what is important in life, a greater appreciation of the value of one's own life, and increased appreciation of each day. This can be compared to the "satisfaction with life" core ideal of positive psychology.

In 2004, Tedeschi and Calhoun released an updated framework of PTG. The overlaps between positive psychology and post-traumatic growth demonstrate an overwhelming association between these frameworks. However, Tedeschi and Calhoun note that even though these domains describe positive psychological changes post-trauma, the presence of PTG does not necessarily rule out the occurrence of any simultaneous negative post-trauma mental processes nor negative outcomes (such as psychological distress).

==== Positive psychology and clinical applications ====
In a clinical setting, PTG is often included as a part of positive psychology in terms of methodology and treatment goals. Positive psychology interventions (PPI) generally include a multidimensional, therapeutic approach in which psychological tests are measurements to track progress. For clinical PPI involving recovery from trauma, there is usually at least one measure of PTG. Most trauma research and clinical intervention focuses on evaluating the negative outcomes post-trauma. But from a positive psychological perspective, a strengths-based approach might be more relevant for clinical intervention aimed at recovery. While PTG has been effectively measured in a number of relevant areas of psychology, it has been especially successful in health psychology.

In the exploration of PTG in health psychology settings (hospitals, long-term care clinics, etc.), well-being (a core ideal of positive psychology) was linked to increased PTG in patients. PTG is seen more often in health psychology settings when PPI are utilized. While the focus in health psychology settings is to foster resilience, new research indicates that health psychology practitioners, doctors, and nurses should also aim to increase positive psychological outcomes (such as PTG) as a part of their recovery goals. Resilience is also central to positive psychology and is involved with PTG. Resilience has been distinguished as a pathway to PTG, but its exact relationship is currently still being explored. That being said, they are both positive psychological processes with strong ties to positive psychology.

The use of PPI post-trauma is not only effective in increasing PTG, but it has also been shown to reduce negative post-traumatic symptoms. These reductions on post-traumatic stress symptoms and increases in PTG have been demonstrated to be long-lasting. When participants were followed up at 12 months post PPI, not only was the PTG still present, it actually increased over time. PPI targeted at reducing stress have demonstrated promising results across a large number of studies.

==== Conclusion ====
Over the last 25 years, PTG has demonstrated its place in the framework of positive psychology in theory and in practice. The theoretical framework put forth by Seligman and Csikszentmihalyi and Tedeschi & Calhoun have substantial overlap and both cite "positive psychological changes". While positive psychology speaks to a general focus on positive aspects of human psychology, PTG speaks specifically to positive psychological change after trauma. This would inherently make PTG a sub-category of positive psychology. PTG has also been referred to in the literature as perceived benefits, positive changes, stress-related growth, and adversarial growth. However, it is made clear that regardless of the terminology, it is based is positive mental changes, which is the essence of positive psychology.

=== Psycho-oncology and PTG ===
The study of those who have experienced cancer has contributed significantly to the understanding of PTG. While more research is needed to establish the prevalence of cancer related PTG, there is mounting evidence that high rates of patients experience some form of positive growth.

==== Trauma exposure in psycho-oncology ====
Individuals diagnosed with cancer may encounter a diverse range of stressors across the stages of the experience. Further, what is traumatic differs from person to person. For example, feelings of uncertainty or fear of death are common following a diagnosis. Distress may also arise from physical symptoms from the illness itself or from cancer treatments. The process of contending with cancer often brings about significant life changes such as economic strain or social role reversals. Among survivors, fear of recurrence is common. The loved ones and caregivers of patients may also experience severe stressors which may lead to PTG.

The impact of trauma on this population is evident in both negative and growth outcomes. PTSD is more common among individuals who are diagnosed with cancer than those who have not, and rates of PTSD are higher in those who experience some cancer types (e.g. brain cancer) and treatment types (e.g. chemotherapy) than in others. Cancer type also matters for PTG, as more advanced forms are more strongly associated with growth. Studying cancer patients has shed light on the relationship on the relationship between PTSD and PTG. While some studies have found a correlation between PTSD and PTG among cancer patients, others conclude that they are independent constructs.

==== Promotive factors in psycho-oncology ====
There are many variables which are associated with development of PTG for oncology patients such as social support, subjective appraisal of the threat, and positive coping strategies. In cancer patients, hope, optimism, spirituality, and positive coping styles are associated with PTG outcomes.

Limited research has investigated whether psychosocial interventions can support the development of PTG. A recent meta-analysis of randomized controlled trials found that psychosocial interventions for cancer patients, especially mindfulness-based interventions, show promise in facilitating PTG. More research is needed in this area to understand how interventions can impact PTG in oncology populations.

==== Characterizing PTG outcomes in psycho-oncology ====
Post-traumatic growth takes on many forms in the lives of cancer patients and survivors. For patients, PTG is often described in three categories. 1) They may identify themselves as having strengths or skills that made them competent in the difficult situation. 2) After emotional growth, they may find changes in their personal relationships such as increased closeness or appreciation. 3) Their experience may lead to a greater appreciation of life or strengthen their spirituality.

Jimmie Holland, a founder in the field of psycho-oncology, provides examples of growth following cancer in her book In The Human Side of Cancer. Holland tells the story of one patient, Jim, whose experience with PTG altered both his perspective on life and his interpersonal relationships. After undergoing radiation for cancer of the vocal cord, Jim found a new appreciation for health and used his experience to motivate his sons to never start smoking. Further, survivors of cancer often discover a new sense of compassion and find new purpose in giving back to others. After surviving osteogenic sarcoma which resulted in the amputation of her leg, Sheila Kussner began giving back by visiting other amputees in hospitals to share support. She later went on to raise millions of dollars for cancer research and establishing the Hope and Cope program at the Montreal Jewish General hospital which provides psychological support to thousands of patients. These examples may fit within the realm of PTG.

== Related theories and constructs ==
=== Resilience ===
In general, research in psychology shows that people are resilient overall. For example, Southwick and Charney, in a study of 250 prisoners of war from Vietnam, showed that participants developed much lower rates of depression and PTSD symptoms than expected. Donald Meichenbaum estimated that 60% of North Americans will experience trauma in their lifetime, and of these while no one is unscathed, some 70% show resilience and 30% show harmful effects. Similarly, 68 million women of the 150 million in America will be victimized over their lifetime, but a shocking 10% will suffer insofar as they must seek help from mental health professionals.

In general, traditional psychology's approach to resiliency as exhibited in the studies above is a problem-oriented one, assuming that PTSD is the problem and that resiliency just means to avoid or fix that problem in order to maintain baseline well-being. This type of approach fails to acknowledge any growth that might occur beyond the previously set baseline, however. Positive psychology's idea of thriving attempts to reconcile that failure. A meta-analysis of studies done by Shakespeare-Finch and Lurie-Beck in this area indicates that there is actually an association between PTSD symptoms and post-traumatic growth. The null hypothesis that there is no relationship between the two was rejected for the study. The correlation between the two was significant and was found to be dependent upon the nature of the event and the person's age. For example, survivors of sexual assault show less post-traumatic growth than survivors of natural disaster. Ultimately, however, the meta-analysis serves to show that PTSD and post-traumatic growth are not mutually exclusive ends of a recovery spectrum and that they may actually co-occur during a successful process to thriving.

While aspects of resilience and growth aid an individual's psychological well-being, they are not the same thing. Dr. Richard Tedeschi and Dr. Erika Felix specifically note that resilience suggests bouncing back and returning to one's previous state of being, whereas post-traumatic growth fosters a transformed way of being or understanding for an individual. Often, traumatic or challenging experiences force an individual to re-evaluate core beliefs, values, or behaviors on both cognitive and emotional levels; the idea of post-traumatic growth is therefore rooted in the notion that these beliefs, values, or behaviors come with a new perspective and expectation after the event. Thus, post-traumatic growth centers around the concept of change, whereas resilience suggests the return to previous beliefs, values, or lifestyles.

=== Thriving ===
To understand the significance of thriving in the human experience, it is important to understand its role within the context of trauma and its separation from traditional psychology's idea of resilience. Implicit in the idea of thriving and resilience both is the presence of adversity. O'Leary and Ickovics created a four-part diagram of the spectrum of human response to adversity, the possibilities of which include: succumbing to adversity, surviving with diminished quality of life, resiliency (returning to baseline quality of life), and thriving. Thriving includes not only resiliency, but an additional further improvement over the quality of life previous to the adverse event.

Thriving in positive psychology definitely aims to promote growth beyond survival, but some of the theories surrounding the causes and effects of it are more ambiguous. Literature by Carver indicates that the concept of thriving is a difficult one to define objectively. He makes the distinction between physical and psychological thriving, implying that while physical thriving has obvious measurable results, psychological thriving does not as much. This is the origin of much ambiguity surrounding the concept. Carver lists several self-reportable indicators of thriving: greater acceptance of self, change in philosophy, and a change in priorities. These are factors that generally lead a person to feel that they have grown, but obviously are difficult to measure quantitatively.

The dynamic systems approach to thriving attempts to resolve some of the ambiguity in the quantitative definition of thriving, citing thriving as an improvement in adaptability to future trauma based on their model of attractors and attractor basins. This approach suggests that reorganization of behaviors is required to make positive adaptive behavior a more significant attractor basin, which is an area the system shows a tendency toward.

In general, as pointed out by Carver, the idea of thriving seems to be one that is hard to remove from subjective experience. However, work done by Meichenbaum to create his Posttraumatic Growth Inventory helps to set forth a more measurable map of thriving. The five fields of post-traumatic growth that Meichenbaum outlined include: relating to others, new possibilities, personal strength, spiritual change, and appreciation for life. Though literature that addresses "thriving" specifically is sparse, there is much research in the five areas Meichenbaum cites as facilitating thriving, all of which supports the idea that growth after adversity is a viable and significant possibility for human well-being.

=== Positive disintegration ===
The theory of positive disintegration by Kazimierz Dąbrowski is a theory that postulates that symptoms such as psychological tension and anxiety could be signs that a person might be in positive disintegration.The theory proposes that this can happen when an individual rejects previously adopted values (relating to their physical survival and their place in society), and adopts new values that are based on the higher possible version of who they can be. Rather than seeing disintegration as a negative state, the theory proposes that is a transient state which allows an individual to grow towards their personality ideal. The theory stipulates that individuals who have a high development potential (i.e. those with overexcitabilities), have a higher chance of re-integrating at a higher level of development, after disintegration. Scholarly work is needed to ascertain whether disintegrative processes, as specified by the theory, are traumatic, and whether reaching higher integration, e.g. Level IV (directed multilevel disintegration) or V (secondary integration), can be equated to post-traumatic growth.

=== Aspects ===
Another attempt at quantitatively charting the concept of thriving is via the Posttraumatic Growth Inventory. The inventory has 21 items and is designed to measure the extent to which one experiences personal growth after adversity. The inventory includes elements from five key areas: relating to others, new possibilities, personal strength, spiritual change, and appreciation for life. These five categories are reminiscent of the subjective experiences Carver struggled to quantify in his own literature on thriving, but are imposed onto scales to maintain measurability. When considering the idea of thriving from the five-point approach, it is easier to place more research from psychology within the context of thriving. Additionally, a short form version of the Posttraumatic Growth Inventory has been created with only 10 items, selecting two questions for each of the five subscales. Studies have been conducted to better understand the validity of this scale and some have found that self-reported measures of post-traumatic growth are unreliable. Frazier et al. (2009) reported that further improvement could be made to this inventory to better capture actual change.

One of the key facets of post-traumatic growth set forth by Meichenbaum is relating to others. Accordingly, much work has been done to indicate that social support resources are extremely important to the facilitation of thriving. House, Cohen, and their colleagues indicate that perception of adequate social support is associated with improved adaptive tendency. This idea of better adaptive tendency is central to thriving in that it results in an improved approach to future adversity. Similarly, Hazan and Shaver reason that social support provides a solid base of security for human endeavor. The idea of human endeavor here is echoed in another of Meichenbaum's facets of post-traumatic growth, new possibilities, the idea being that a person's confidence to "endeavor" in the face of novelty is a sign of thriving.

Concurrent with a third facet of Meichenbaum's post-traumatic growth, personal strength, a meta analysis of six qualitative studies done by Finfgeld focuses on courage as a path to thriving. Evidence from the analysis indicates that the ability to be courageous includes acceptance of reality, problem-solving, and determination. This not only directly supports the significance of personal strength in thriving, but can also be drawn to Meichenbaum's concept of "new possibilities" through the idea that determination and adaptive problem-solving aid in constructively confronting new possibilities. Besides this, it was found in Finfgeld's study that courage is promoted and sustained by intra- and interpersonal forces, further supporting Meichenbaum's concept of "relating to others" and its effect on thriving.

On Meichenbaum's idea of appreciation for life, research done by Tyson on a sample of people 2–5 years into grieving processing reveals the importance of creating meaning. The studies show that coping with bereavement optimally does not only involve just "getting over it and moving on", but should also include creating meaning to facilitate the best recovery. The study showed that stories and creative forms of expression increase growth following bereavement. This evidence is supported strongly by work done by Michael and Cooper focused on facets of bereavement that facilitate growth including "the age of the bereaved", "social support", "time since death", "religion", and "active cognitive coping strategies". The idea of coping strategies is echoed through the importance thriving places on improving adaptability. The significance of social support to growth found by Michael and Cooper clearly supports Meichenbaum's concept of "relating to others". Similarly, the significance of religion echoes Meichenbaum's "spiritual change" facet of post-traumatic growth.

Comparison-based thinking has been shown to aid in the development of post-traumatic growth, in which a person considers the positive differences between their current lives and their life during a traumatic event. Increases in empathy and desire to help others have been observed in trauma survivors as a form of post-traumatic growth. Storytelling with fellow community members, particularly those who have been through similar trauma, can help form a sense of community and encourage self-reflection.

=== Criticisms, concerns, and objective evidence of PTG ===
While post-traumatic growth is commonly self-reported by people from different cultures across the world, concerns were raised on the basis that objectively measurable evidence of post-traumatic growth was limited. This led some to the question of whether post-traumatic growth was real or illusory. The concept that post-traumatic growth can be illusory was originally posed by Andreas Maercker and Tanja Zoellner, who suggested that perceptions of PTG manifest itself in two sides: a transformative, constructive side, and an illusory, self-deceptive side. This self-deception side is used as a mechanism of coping with, or making sense of, a traumatic event in one's life, rather than proof of an improved psychological state. Additionally, Adriel Boals suggests a third branch of PTG: perceived PTG, under which illusory and "genuine" PTG fall . Boals asserts that those with perceived PTG often misreport genuine PTG during self-reports, as they are instead experiencing illusory PTG. Indeed, Boals claims that illusory PTG is more common in individuals with perceived PTG, than is genuine PTG. Furthermore, while a meta-analysis by Shakespeare-Finch and Lurie-Beck found PTG has a strong curvilinear relationship with PTSD (indicating PTG is highest when PTSD is moderate), numerous studies have shown that PTG is positively associated with post-traumatic stress, which authors such as Boals suggest is a contradiction of the original definition of PTG.

More recently, evidence of the objectively measurable existence of PTG has begun to emerge. A range of biological research is finding real differences between individuals with and without PTG at the level of gene expression and brain activity.

Post-traumatic growth
- MeSH: D000078002

== See also ==
- Post-traumatic stress disorder
- Positive disintegration
- Psychological trauma
- Psychological resilience

== Bibliography ==
- O'Rourke J, Tallman R, Altmaier E (2008). "Measuring Post-Traumatic Changes in Spirituality/Religiosity". Mental Health, Religion & Culture. 11 (7): 719–728. doi:10.1080/13674670801993336. S2CID 144723593.
- Ozbay F, Johnson DC, Dimoulas E, Morgan CA, Charney D, Southwick S (May 2007). "Social support and resilience to stress: from neurobiology to clinical practice". Psychiatry. 4 (5): 35–40. PMC 2921311. PMID 20806028.
- Haas M (2015). Bouncing Forward: Transforming Bad Breaks into Breakthroughs. Atria/Enliven. ISBN 978-1-5011-1512-7.
- Slavin-Spenny OM, Cohen JL, Oberleitner LM, Lumley MA (October 2011). "The effects of different methods of emotional disclosure: differentiating post-traumatic growth from stress symptoms". Journal of Clinical Psychology. 67 (10): 993–1007. doi:10.1002/jclp.20750. PMC 3525957. PMID 21905025.
- Lilly MM, Valdez CE (2012). "Interpersonal Trauma and PTSD: The Roles of Gender and a Lifespan Perspective in Predicting Risk". Psychological Trauma: Theory, Research, Practice, and Policy. 4: 140–144. doi:10.1037/a0022947.
- Rosenstein D, Yopp J (2018). The Group: Seven Widowed Fathers Reimagine Life. Oxford University Press. ISBN 978-0-19-064956-2.
