= Bartley Christopher Frueh =

American psychologist and novelist (born 1963)

- Born: 1963 (age 62–63); New York City, U.S.
- Education: Kenyon College (BA); University of South Florida (PhD)
- Known for: Clinical research; Writing
- Scientific career
- Fields: Psychology, psychiatry
- Workplaces: University of Hawaiʻi; The Menninger Clinic

Bartley Christopher Frueh (born 1963) is a clinical psychologist and American author.

== Early life and education ==
Frueh was born in New York City in 1963. He received his Bachelor of Arts in psychology from Kenyon College in 1985 and his PhD in Clinical Psychology from the University of South Florida in 1992.

== Career ==
Frueh is a licensed clinical psychologist and holds faculty appointments as Professor of Psychology at the University of Hawaiʻi at Hilo, Clinical Professor of Psychiatry, University of Texas Health Science Center, Houston, Texas, and adjunct professor, Psychiatry in Neurosurgery, Houston Methodist Academic Institute.

Formerly, Frueh was a professor of psychiatry at both Baylor College of Medicine and the Medical University of South Carolina in Charleston, South Carolina, as well as director of research at The Menninger Clinic in Houston, Texas. He also spent 15 years as a staff psychologist and director of the PTSD Clinic at the Veteran Affairs Medical Center in Charleston, South Carolina. He has 30 years of professional experience working with military veterans and active-duty personnel.

Frueh also sits on the Scientific Advisory Panel for both the SEAL Future Foundation and Boulder Crest Foundation, the Wellness Advisory Board for the Military Special Operations Family Collaborative, and the Medical Advisory Committee for the PTSD Foundation of America.

He has served as a paid contractor for the Department of Defense, Veterans Affairs, US State Department, and the National Board of Medical Examiners. Frueh's mental health related commentaries have also been published in National Review, Huffington Post, The New York Times, Men's Journal, and Special Operation Association of America; and has been quoted or cited in The Washington Post, Scientific American, The Wall Street Journal, The Economist, Stars and Stripes, USA Today, Men’s Health, Los Angeles Times, Reuter, Associated Press, and NBC News.

== Research ==
Frueh has conducted clinical trials, epidemiology, historical epidemiology, and neuroscience research, primarily with combat veterans, and has acted as principal investigator on 15 federally funded research projects and co-investigator, mentor, or consultant on over 25 others. The focus of much of Frueh's research is aimed towards trauma survivors experiencing psychological disorders such as Post-Traumatic Stress Disorder. Over the course of his career Frueh has authored over 300 peer reviewed scientific publications.

=== Most cited works ===
- Prevalence Estimates of Combat-Related Post-Traumatic Stress Disorder: Critical Review
- Poly-Victimization and Risk of Posttraumatic, Depressive, and Substance Use Disorders and Involvement in Delinquency in a National Sample of Adolescents
- Special Section on Seclusion and Restraint: Patients' Reports of Traumatic or Harmful Experiences Within the Psychiatric Setting
- Current directions in videoconferencing tele-mental health research
- Apparent symptom overreporting in combat veterans evaluated for ptsd

== Recent works ==
Frueh is co-author of Assessment and Treatment Planning for PTSD, a guide providing evidence-based approaches for the diagnosis and treatment of PTSD.

Additionally, under the pen name of Christopher Bartley, he is a noir crime novelist who created the hardboiled Ross Duncan Series (They Die Alone, 2013, etc.) set in 1934 America at the end of the Prohibition during the public enemy era. The series’ protagonist, Ross Duncan, is a hunted criminal, but he is also a wandering observer who engages with people from all strata of society, polite or otherwise.

=== Ross Duncan series ===
- They Die Alone (2013)
- Sleep Not, My Child (2013)
- For a Sin Offering (2013)
- To Catch is Not to Hold (2013)
- Unto the Daughters of Men (2013)
- A Bullet to Dream Of (2014)
- Every Secret Thing (2014)
- Naked Shall I Return (2015)

More recently, Frueh has also published A Season’s Past (2019), a collection of novellas featuring men with guns and their search for meaning and intimacy.
