= Boulder Crest Foundation =

Nonprofit organization based in Bluemont, Virginia

- Founder: Ken Falke, Julia Falke
- Location: Snickersville, Bluemont, Virginia
- Website: https://bouldercrest.org/

Boulder Crest Foundation is a Nonprofit organization which is committed for improving the physical, economic, spiritual and emotional well-being of veterans and their family members.

== History ==
Boulder Crest Foundation was founded by Ken Falke and Julia Falke. During the wars in Afghanistan and Iraq, many warriors were killed and injured on the battlefields. Ken and Julia visited these EOD warriors and their families and realized that these warriors deserves more support. In 2010, the Falkes donated 37 acres of their property and established Boulder Crest.

== Boulder Crest Institute For Post-Traumatic Growth ==
Boulder Crest Institute For Post-traumatic Growth is located in Bluemont, Virginia. It serves as the hub for the delivery, development and scailing of posttraumatic growth-based programs. Boulder Crest Institute is the world leader in advancing the science of Posttraumatic Growth (PTG). In 1995, The science of Posttraumatic Growth was initially described. Currently, Dr. Richard Tedeschi chairs the Boulder Crest Institute.
