= Michael Piechowski =

Polish-born American psychologist

Michael M. Piechowski (born 1933) is a Polish-born American psychologist who, in 1979, introduced the construct of overexcitability to gifted education

Piechowski worked with Kazimierz Dabrowski, the author of the theory of positive disintegration, which encompassed the construct of overexcitability. Piechowski's research has primarily focused on overexcitability and its measurement.

Michael Piechowski has authored some fifty publications on giftedness and overexcitability, including "Mellow Out, They Say. If I Only Could: Intensities and Sensitivities of the Young and Bright" and "Living with Intensity: Understanding the Sensitivity, Excitability, and Emotional Development of Gifted Children, Adolescents, and Adults," which he co-edited with Susan Daniels.

Piechowski's approach emphasized recognizing the overexcitability often exhibited by gifted individuals. He has advocated for appropriate educational and psychological support to help gifted individuals reach their full potential.

== Sources ==
- Piechowski, M. (2014). "Mellow Out," They Say. If Only I Could: Intensities and Sensitivities of the Young and Bright. Royal Fireworks Press.
- Piechowski, M.; Daniels, S., eds. (2009). Living with Intensity: Understanding the Sensitivity, Excitability, and Emotional Development of Gifted Children, Adolescents, and Adults. Great Potential Press.
