= Human potential =

Human development concept

Human potential is the capacity for humans to improve themselves through studying, training, and practice, to reach the limit of their ability to develop aptitudes and skills. "Inherent within the notion of human potential is the belief that in reaching their full potential an individual will be able to lead a happy and more fulfilled life".

== Meaning and scope ==
The term potential generally refers to a currently unrealized ability. The term is used in a wide variety of fields, from physics to the social sciences to indicate things that are in a state where they are able to change in ways ranging from the simple release of energy by objects to the realization of abilities in people. The philosopher Aristotle incorporated this concept into his theory of potentiality and actuality, a pair of closely connected principles which he used to analyze motion, causality, ethics, and physiology in his Physics, Metaphysics, Nicomachean Ethics and De Anima, which is about the human psyche. That which is potential can theoretically be made actual by taking the right action; for example, a boulder on the edge of a cliff has potential to fall that could be actualized by pushing it over the edge, and a person whose natural aptitudes give them the potential to be a great pianist can actualize that potential by diligently practicing playing the piano.

The concept of developing potential is sometimes described in terms of becoming the best version of oneself. Persons who are believed to have a degree of potential that they do not pursue are often described as having failed to "live up to their potential".

Early conceptions of human potential suggested that the full potential of any person was innate in that person from before their birth, possibly from the moment of their conception. More recent definitions have encompassed both internal and societal influences.

== Human-potential model ==
According to the American Psychological Association, the human-potential model is an approach in the field of Education that "emphasizes the importance of helping learners to achieve the maximum development of their potential in all aspects of their functioning". It is related to and draws from the associated field of humanistic psychology.

== Human Potential Movement ==
The Human Potential Movement was a particular counterculture movement started in the 1960s with a focus of maximizing human potential. It was influenced by the work of those such as Abraham Maslow, and took the form of a type of psychological philosophy.

== See also ==
- Maslow's hierarchy of needs, psychological theory regarding behavioral motivation and self-actualization
- Personal development, activities over the course of a person's life that contribute to things such as the improvement of awareness and identity
- Social development theory, which attempts to explain qualitative changes in the structure and framework of society, that help the society to better realize aims and objectives
