= Maslow on Management =

1965 book by Abraham Maslow

- First edition (with original title)
- Author: Abraham Maslow
- Original title: Eupsychian Management: A Journal
- Language: English
- Subject: Psychology
- Publisher: R. D. Irwin (1965)
- Publication date: 1965
- Media type: Print
- Pages: 277

Maslow on Management (originally Eupsychian Management: A Journal) is a work on industrial psychology by Abraham Maslow, first published in 1965. Maslow's work is frequently invoked in attempts to explain and predict work behavior. In his work Maslow advocated the eupsychian (meaning moving towards psychological health or self-actualization) management as the ideal model for industrial organizations. Maslow took a keen interest in the application of humanistic psychology beyond one-on-one therapy to larger endeavors in organizations and education settings, where greater numbers of people could be positively affected.

The idea for Eupsychian Management originated with a journal of Maslow's impressions of his 1962 observations of a California electronics plant. The study resulted in Maslow conceiving a theoretical framework on which research in the area of self-actualization may be applied to industrial organizations. Not wanting to use the word "utopian", Maslow coined the term "eupsychian" to describe human-oriented institutions generated by self-actualized people. He said it could also be used to mean "moving toward psychological health".

Maslow noted the commitment to work in self-actualizing people's lives: "These highly evolved individuals assimilate their work into the identity, into the self, ie, work actually becomes part of the self, part of the individual's definition of himself." These most highly evolved persons would actually assimilate work as part of their personal identity.

Maslow's industrial motivation theory has been criticized for tending to emphasize only identification of second-level outcomes.

== Maslow's writings on management ==
Maslow wrote extensively concerning the application of humanistic psychology to management. Relevant publications include:

- Maslow, Abraham H. Eupsychian management. Homewood, IL: Irwin, 1965 (reprinted as Maslow on management, Wiley, 1998).
- Maslow, Abraham H. The Maslow business reader. Wiley, 2000.
- Maslow, Abraham H. Theory Z. Journal of Transpersonal Psychology, 1969, 1(2), 31–47. Reprinted in Maslow business reader (pp. 171−184) and A. H. Maslow, The farther reaches of human nature, New York, 1971 (pp. 270–286).

== See also ==
- Motivation
- Theory Z
