= Abraham Maslow =

American psychologist (1908–1970)

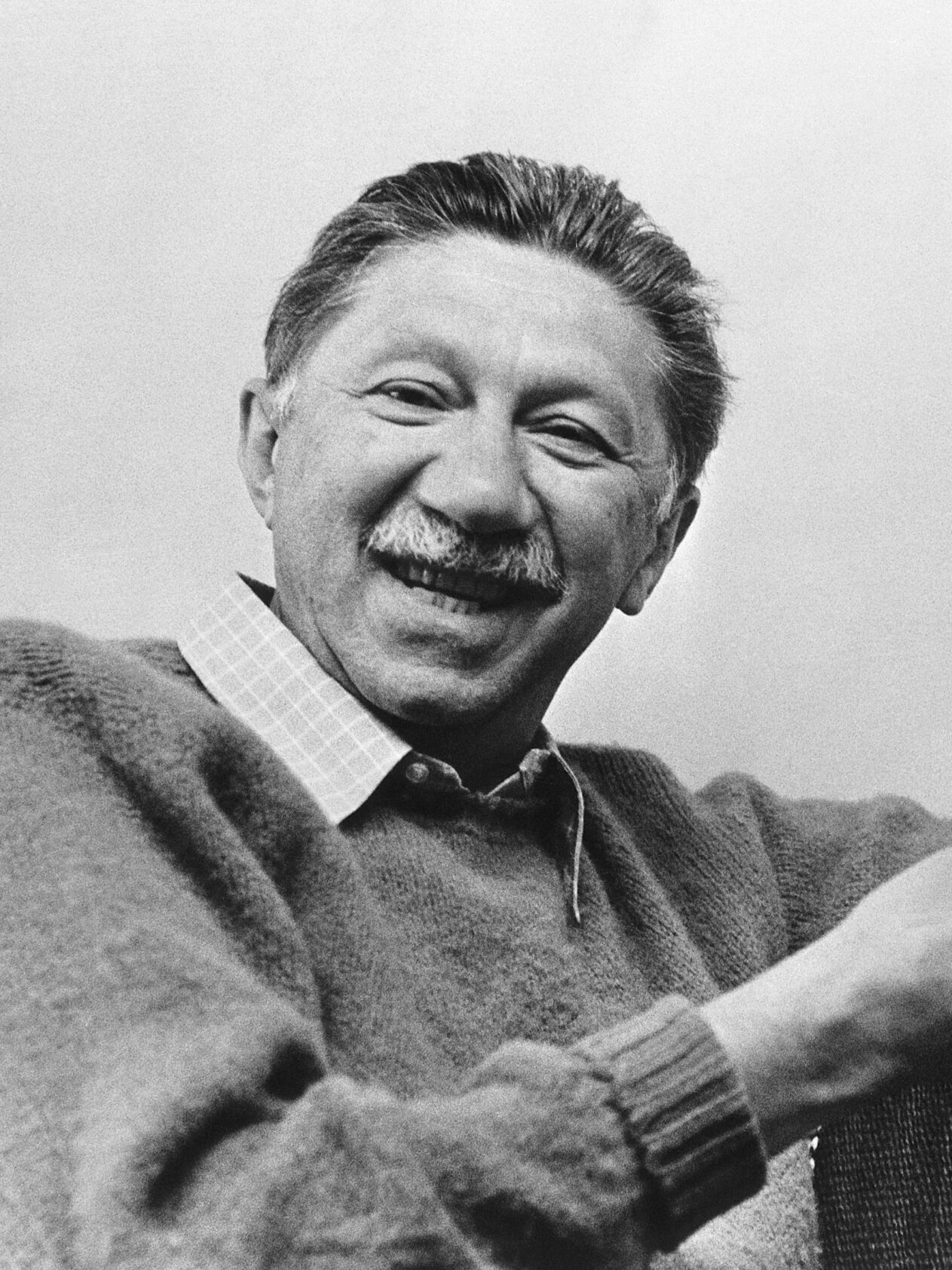
- Born: Abraham Harold Maslow; April 1, 1908; Brooklyn, New York, U.S.
- Died: June 8, 1970 (aged 62); Menlo Park, California, U.S.
- Education: City College of New York; Cornell University; University of Wisconsin
- Known for: Maslow's hierarchy of needs
- Spouse: Bertha Goodman Maslow (m. 1928)
- Children: 2
- Scientific career
- Fields: Psychology
- Workplaces: Cornell University; Brooklyn College; Brandeis University; The New School for Social Research; Columbia University
- Doctoral advisor: Harry Harlow

Abraham Harold Maslow (/ˈmæzloʊ/ MAZ-loh; April 1, 1908 – June 8, 1970) was an American psychologist who created Maslow's hierarchy of needs, a theory of psychological health predicated on fulfilling innate human needs in priority, culminating in self-actualization.

Maslow was a psychology professor at Cornell University, Brooklyn College, Brandeis University, The New School for Social Research, and Columbia University. He stressed the importance of focusing on the positive qualities in people, as opposed to treating them as a "bag of symptoms". A Review of General Psychology survey, published in 2002, ranked Maslow as the tenth most cited psychologist of the 20th century.

== Biography ==
=== Youth ===
Born in 1908 and raised in Brooklyn, New York, Maslow was the oldest of seven children. His parents were first-generation Jewish immigrants from Kyiv, then part of the Russian Empire (now Kyiv, Ukraine), who fled from Czarist persecution in the early 20th century. They had decided to live in New York City and in a multiethnic, working-class neighborhood. His parents were poor and not intellectually focused, but they valued education. He had various encounters with antisemitic gangs who would chase and throw rocks at him.

He eventually developed a strong revulsion towards his mother. He is quoted as saying,

What I had reacted to was not only her physical appearance, but also her values and world view, her stinginess, her total selfishness, her lack of love for anyone else in the world—even her own husband and children—her narcissism, her Negro prejudice, her exploitation of everyone, her assumption that anyone was wrong who disagreed with her, her lack of friends, her sloppiness and dirtiness...

He also grew up with few friends other than his cousin Will, and as a result, he grew up in libraries and among books. It was here that he developed his love for reading and learning. He went to Boys High School, one of the top high schools in Brooklyn, where his best friend was his cousin Will Maslow. Here, he served as the officer to many academic clubs and became editor of the Latin magazine. He also edited Principia, the school's physics paper, for a year. He developed other strengths as well:

As a young boy, Maslow believed physical strength to be the single most defining characteristic of a true male; hence, he exercised often and took up weight lifting in hopes of being transformed into a more muscular, tough-looking guy, however, he was unable to achieve this due to his humble-looking and chaste figure as well as his studiousness.

=== College and university ===
Maslow attended the City College of New York after high school. In 1926, he began taking legal studies classes at night in addition to his undergraduate course load. He disliked it and almost immediately dropped out. In 1927, he transferred to Cornell University but left after just one semester due to poor grades and high costs. He later graduated from City College and went to graduate school at the University of Wisconsin to study psychology. In 1928, he married his first cousin, Bertha, who was still in high school. The pair had met in Brooklyn years earlier.

Maslow's psychology training at University of Wisconsin was decidedly experimental-behaviorist. At Wisconsin, he pursued a line of research that included investigating primate dominance behavior and sexuality. Maslow's early experience with behaviorism would leave him with a strong positivist mindset. Upon the recommendation of professor Hulsey Cason, Maslow wrote his master's thesis on "learning, retention, and reproduction of verbal material". Maslow regarded the research as embarrassingly trivial, but he completed his thesis in the summer of 1931 and was awarded his master's degree in psychology. He was so ashamed of the thesis that he removed it from the psychology library and tore out its catalog listing. However, Cason admired the research enough to urge Maslow to submit it for publication. Maslow's thesis was published as two articles in 1934.

=== Academic career ===
Maslow continued his research on similar themes at Columbia University. There he found another mentor in Alfred Adler, one of Sigmund Freud's early colleagues. From 1937 to 1951, Maslow was on the faculty of Brooklyn College. His family life and his experiences influenced his psychological ideas. After World War II, Maslow began to question how psychologists had come to their conclusions, and though he did not completely disagree, he had his own ideas on how to understand the human mind. He called his new discipline humanistic psychology. Maslow was already 33 years old and had two children when the United States entered World War II in 1941. He was thus ineligible for military service. However, the war inspired a vision of peace in him, leading to his groundbreaking psychological studies of self-actualizing. The studies began under the supervision of two mentors, anthropologist Ruth Benedict and Gestalt psychologist Max Wertheimer, whom he admired professionally and personally. They accomplished a lot in both realms. Being such "wonderful human beings" also inspired Maslow to take notes about them and their behavior. This would be the basis of his lifelong research and thinking about mental health and human potential.

Maslow extended the subject, borrowing ideas from other psychologists and adding new ones, such as the concepts of a hierarchy of needs, metaneeds, metamotivation, self-actualizing persons, and peak experiences. He was a professor at Brandeis University from 1951 to 1969. He became a resident fellow of the Laughlin Institute in California. In 1967, Maslow had a serious heart attack and knew his time was limited. He considered himself to be a psychological pioneer. He pushed future psychologists by bringing to light different paths to ponder. He built the framework that later allowed other psychologists to conduct more comprehensive studies. Maslow believed that leadership should be non-intervening. Consistent with this approach, he rejected a nomination in 1963 to be the Association for Humanistic Psychology president because he felt the organization should develop an intellectual movement without a leader.

=== Death ===
While jogging, Maslow had a severe heart attack and died on June 8, 1970, at the age of 62 in Menlo Park, California. He is buried at Mount Auburn Cemetery.

== Psychology ==
=== Humanistic psychology ===
Most psychologists before him had been concerned with the abnormal and the ill. He urged people to acknowledge their basic needs before addressing higher needs and ultimately self-actualization. He wanted to know what constituted positive mental health. Humanistic psychology gave rise to several different therapies, all guided by the idea that people possess the inner resources for growth and healing and that the point of therapy is to help remove obstacles to individuals' achieving them. The most famous of these was client-centered therapy developed by Carl Rogers.

The basic principles behind humanistic psychology are simple:

- Someone's present functioning is their most significant aspect. As a result, humanists emphasize the here and now instead of examining the past or attempting to predict the future.
- To be mentally healthy, individuals must take personal responsibility for their actions, regardless of whether the actions are positive or negative.
- Each person, simply by being, is inherently worthy. While any given action may be negative, these actions do not cancel out the value of a person.
- The ultimate goal of living is to attain personal growth and understanding. Only through constant self-improvement and self-understanding can an individual ever be truly happy.

Humanistic psychology theory suits people who see the positive side of humanity and believe in free will. This theory clearly contrasts with Freud's theory of biological determinism. Another significant strength is that humanistic psychology theory is compatible with other schools of thought. Maslow's hierarchy is also applicable to other topics, such as finance, economics, or even in history or criminology. Humanist psychology, also coined positive psychology, is criticized for its lack of empirical validation and therefore its lack of usefulness in treating specific problems. It may also fail to help or diagnose people who have severe mental disorders. Humanistic psychologists believe that every person has a strong desire to realize their full potential, to reach a level of "self-actualization". The main point of that new movement, that reached its peak in the 1960s, was to emphasize the positive potential of human beings. Maslow positioned his work as a vital complement to that of Freud:

It is as if Freud supplied us the sick half of psychology and we must now fill it out with the healthy half.

However, Maslow was highly critical of Freud, since humanistic psychologists did not recognize spirituality as a navigation for our behaviors.

To prove that humans are not blindly reacting to situations, but trying to accomplish something greater, Maslow studied mentally healthy individuals instead of people with serious psychological issues. He focused on self-actualizing people. Self-actualizing people indicate a coherent personality syndrome and represent optimal psychological health and functioning.

This informed his theory that a person enjoys "peak experiences", high points in life when the individual is in harmony with himself and his surroundings. In Maslow's view, self-actualized people can have many peak experiences throughout a day, while others have those experiences less frequently. He believed that psychedelic drugs like LSD and psilocybin can produce peak experiences in the right people under the right circumstances.

=== Peak and plateau experiences ===
Beyond the routine of needs fulfillment, Maslow envisioned moments of extraordinary experience, known as "peak experiences", which are profound moments of love, understanding, happiness, or rapture, during which a person feels more whole, alive, self-sufficient and yet a part of the world, more aware of truth, justice, harmony, goodness, and so on. Self-actualizing people are more likely to have peak experiences. In other words, these "peak experiences" or states of flow are the reflections of the realization of one's human potential and represent the height of personality development.

In later writings, Maslow moved to a more inclusive model that allowed for, in addition to intense peak experiences, longer-lasting periods of serene being-cognition that he termed plateau experiences. He borrowed this term from the Indian scientist and yoga practitioner, U. A. Asrani, with whom he corresponded. Maslow stated that the shift from the peak to the plateau experience is related to the natural aging process, in which an individual has a shift in life values about what is actually important in one's life and what is not important. In spite of the personal significance with the plateau experience, Maslow was not able to conduct a comprehensive study of this phenomenon due to health problems that developed toward the end of his life.

=== B-values ===
In studying accounts of peak experiences, Maslow identified a manner of thought he called "being-cognition" (or "B-cognition"), which is holistic and accepting, as opposed to the evaluative "deficiency-cognition" (or "D-cognition"), and values he called "Being-values". He listed the B-values as:

- Truth: honesty; reality; simplicity; richness; oughtness; beauty; pure, clean and unadulterated; completeness; essentiality
- Goodness: rightness; desirability; oughtness; justice; benevolence; honesty
- Beauty: rightness; form; aliveness; simplicity; richness; wholeness; perfection; completion; uniqueness; honesty
- Wholeness: unity; integration; tendency to one-ness; interconnectedness; simplicity; organization; structure; dichotomy-transcendence; order
- Aliveness: process; non-deadness; spontaneity; self-regulation; full-functioning
- Uniqueness: idiosyncrasy; individuality; non-comparability; novelty
- Perfection: necessity; just-right-ness; just-so-ness; inevitability; suitability; justice; completeness; "oughtness"
- Completion: ending; finality; justice; "it's finished"; fulfillment; finis and telos; destiny; fate
- Justice: fairness; orderliness; lawfulness; "oughtness"
- Simplicity: honesty; essentiality; abstract, essential, skeletal structure
- Richness: differentiation, complexity; intricacy
- Effortlessness: ease; lack of strain, striving or difficulty; grace; perfect, beautiful functioning
- Playfulness: fun; joy; amusement; gaiety; humor; exuberance; effortlessness
- Self-sufficiency: autonomy; independence; not-needing-other-than-itself-in-order-to-be-itself; self-determining; environment-transcendence; separateness; living by its own laws

=== Hierarchy of needs ===
An interpretation of Maslow's hierarchy of needs, represented as a pyramid, with the most basic and common needs at the bottom, and the more advanced and moral needs at the top.

Maslow described human needs as ordered in a prepotent hierarchy—a pressing need would need to be mostly satisfied before someone would give their attention to the next highest need. None of his published works included a visual representation of the hierarchy. The pyramidal diagram illustrating the Maslow needs hierarchy may have been created by a psychology textbook publisher as an illustrative device. This now iconic pyramid frequently depicts the spectrum of human needs, both physical and psychological, as accompaniment to articles describing Maslow's needs theory and may give the impression that the hierarchy of needs is a fixed and rigid sequence of progression. Yet, starting with the first publication of his theory in 1943, Maslow described human needs as being relatively fluid—with many needs being present in a person simultaneously.

The hierarchy of human needs model suggests that human needs will only be fulfilled one level at a time.

According to Maslow's theory, when a human being ascends the levels of the hierarchy having fulfilled the needs in the hierarchy, one may eventually achieve self-actualization. Late in life, Maslow came to conclude that self-actualization was not an automatic outcome of satisfying the other human needs.

Human needs as identified by Maslow:

- At the bottom of the hierarchy are the "basic needs or physiological needs" of a human being: food, water, sleep, sex, homeostasis, and excretion.
- The next level is "safety needs: security, order, and stability". These two steps are important to the physical survival of the person. Once individuals have basic nutrition, shelter and safety, they attempt to accomplish more.
- The third level of need is "love and belonging", which are psychological needs; when individuals have taken care of themselves physically, they are ready to share themselves with others, such as with family and friends.
- The fourth level is achieved when individuals feel comfortable with what they have accomplished. This is the "esteem" level, the need to be competent and recognized, such as through status and level of success.
- Then there is the "cognitive" level, where individuals intellectually stimulate themselves and explore.
- After that is the "aesthetic" level, which is the need for harmony, order and beauty.
- At the top of the pyramid, "need for self-actualization" occurs when individuals reach a state of harmony and understanding because they are engaged in achieving their full potential. Once a person has reached the self-actualization state they focus on themselves and try to build their own image. They may look at this in terms of feelings such as self-confidence or by accomplishing a set goal.

The first four levels are known as deficit needs or D-needs. This means that if there are not enough of one of those four needs, there will be a need to get it. Getting them brings a feeling of contentment. These needs alone are not motivating.

Maslow wrote that there are certain conditions that must be fulfilled in order for the basic needs to be satisfied. For example, freedom of speech, freedom to express oneself, and freedom to seek new information are a few of the prerequisites. Any blockages of these freedoms could prevent the satisfaction of the basic needs.

Maslow's hierarchy is used in higher education for advising students and for student retention as well as a key concept in student development. Maslow's hierarchy has been subject to internet memes over the past few years, specifically looking at the modern integration of technology in people's lives and humorously suggesting that Wi-Fi was among the most basic of human needs.

=== Self-actualization ===
Maslow defined self-actualization as achieving the fullest use of one's talents and interests—the need "to become everything that one is capable of becoming". As implied by its name, self-actualization is highly individualistic and reflects Maslow's premise that the self is "sovereign and inviolable" and entitled to "his or her own tastes, opinions, values, etc." Indeed, some have characterized self-actualization as "healthy narcissism".

=== Qualities of self-actualizing people ===
Maslow realized that the self-actualizing individuals he studied had similar personality traits. Maslow selected individuals based on his subjective view of them as self-actualized people. Some of the people he studied included Thomas Jefferson, Abraham Lincoln, and Eleanor Roosevelt. In his daily journal (1961–63) Maslow wrote: "Eupsychia club, heroes that I write for, my judges, the ones I want to please: Jefferson, Spinoza, Socrates, Aristotle, James, Bergson, Norman Thomas, Upton Sinclair (both heroes of my youth)." All were "reality centered", able to differentiate what was fraudulent from what was genuine. They were also "problem centered", meaning that they treated life's difficulties as problems that demanded solutions. These individuals also were comfortable being alone and had healthy personal relationships. They had only a few close friends and family rather than a large number of shallow relationships.

Self-actualizing people tend to focus on problems outside themselves; have a clear sense of what is true and what is false; are spontaneous and creative; and are not bound too strictly by social conventions.

Maslow noticed that self-actualized individuals had a better insight of reality, deeply accepted themselves, others and the world, and also had faced many problems and were known to be impulsive people. These self-actualized individuals were very independent and private when it came to their environment and culture, especially their very own individual development on "potentialities and inner resources".

According to Maslow, self-actualizing people share the following qualities:

- Truth: honest, reality, beauty, pure, clean and unadulterated completeness
- Goodness: rightness, desirability, uprightness, benevolence, honesty
- Beauty: rightness, form, aliveness, simplicity, richness, wholeness, perfection, completion,
- Wholeness: unity, integration, tendency to oneness, interconnectedness, simplicity, organization, structure, order, not dissociated, synergy
- Dichotomy-transcendence: acceptance, resolution, integration, polarities, opposites, contradictions
- Aliveness: process, not-deadness, spontaneity, self-regulation, full-functioning
- Uniqueness: idiosyncrasy, individuality, non comparability, novelty
- Perfection: nothing superfluous, nothing lacking, everything in its right place, just-rightness, suitability, justice
- Necessity: inevitability: it must be just that way, not changed in any slightest way
- Completion: ending, justice, fulfillment
- Justice: fairness, suitability, disinterestedness, non partiality,
- Order: lawfulness, rightness, perfectly arranged
- Simplicity: abstract, essential skeletal, bluntness
- Richness: differentiation, complexity, intricacy, totality
- Effortlessness: ease; lack of strain, striving, or difficulty
- Playfulness: fun, joy, amusement
- Self-sufficiency: autonomy, independence, self-determining.

Maslow based his theory partially on his own assumptions about human potential and partially on his case studies of historical figures whom he believed to be self-actualized, including Albert Einstein and Henry David Thoreau. Consequently, Maslow argued, the way in which essential needs are fulfilled is just as important as the needs themselves. Together, these define the human experience. To the extent a person finds cooperative social fulfillment, he establishes meaningful relationships with other people and the larger world. In other words, he establishes meaningful connections to an external reality—an essential component of self-actualization. In contrast, to the extent that vital needs find selfish and competitive fulfillment, a person acquires hostile emotions and limited external relationships—his awareness remains internal and limited.

=== Metamotivation ===
Maslow used the term metamotivation to describe self-actualized people who are driven by innate forces beyond their basic needs, so that they may explore and reach their full human potential. Maslow's theory of motivation gave insight on individuals having the ability to be motivated by a calling, mission or life purpose. It is noted that metamotivation may also be connected to what Maslow called B-(being) creativity, which is a creativity that comes from being motivated by a higher stage of growth. Another type of creativity that was described by Maslow is known as D-(deficiency) creativity, which suggests that creativity results from an individual's need to fill a gap that is left by an unsatisfied primary need or the need for assurance and acceptance.

=== Methodology ===
Maslow based his study on the writings of other psychologists, Albert Einstein, and people he knew who [he felt] clearly met the standard of self-actualization.

Maslow used Einstein's writings and accomplishments to exemplify the characteristics of the self-actualized person. Ruth Benedict and Max Wertheimer work was also very influential to Maslow's models of self-actualization. In this case, from a quantitative-sciences perspective there are numerous problems with this particular approach, which has caused much criticism. First, it could be argued that biographical analysis as a method is extremely subjective as it is based entirely on the opinion of the researcher. Personal opinion is always prone to bias, which reduces the validity of any data obtained. Therefore, Maslow's operational definition of Self-actualization must not be uncritically accepted as a quantitative fact.

=== Transpersonal psychology ===
During the 1960s Maslow founded with Stanislav Grof, Viktor Frankl, James Fadiman, Anthony Sutich, Miles Vich and Michael Murphy, the school of transpersonal psychology. Maslow had concluded that humanistic psychology was incapable of explaining all aspects of human experience. He identified various mystical, ecstatic, or spiritual states known as "peak experiences" as experiences beyond self-actualization. Maslow called these experiences "a fourth force in psychology", which he named transpersonal psychology. Transpersonal psychology was concerned with the "empirical, scientific study of, and responsible implementation of the finding relevant to, becoming, mystical, ecstatic, and spiritual states" (Olson & Hergenhahn, 2011).

In 1962, Maslow published a collection of papers on this theme, which developed into his 1968 book Toward a Psychology of Being. In this book Maslow stresses the importance of "transpersonal psychology" to human beings, writing: "without the 'transpersonal' we get sick, violent, and nihilistic, or else hopeless and apathetic" (Olson & Hergenhahn, 2011). Human beings, he came to believe, need something "bigger than themselves" that they are connected to in a naturalistic sense, but not in a religious sense; Maslow himself was an atheist and found it difficult to accept religious experience as valid, unless placed in a positivistic framework. In fact, Maslow's position on God and religion was quite complex. While he rejected organized religion and its beliefs, he wrote extensively on the human being's need for the sacred, and spoke of God in more philosophical terms - as beauty, truth and goodness, or as a force, or a principle.

Awareness of "transpersonal psychology" became widespread within psychology, and the Journal of Transpersonal Psychology was founded in 1969, a year after Abraham Maslow became the president of the American Psychological Association. In the United States, transpersonal psychology encouraged recognition for non-western psychologies, philosophies, and religions, and promoted understanding of "higher states of consciousness", for instance through intense meditation. Transpersonal psychology has been applied in many areas, including transpersonal business studies.

=== Positive psychology ===
Maslow called his work Positive psychology. Since 1968 his work has influenced the development of Positive psychotherapy, a transcultural, humanistic based psychodynamic psychotherapy method, used in mental health and psychosomatic treatment, founded by Nossrat Peseschkian. Since 1999 Maslow's work enjoyed a revival of interest and influence among leaders of the Positive psychology movement such as Martin Seligman. This movement focuses only on a higher human nature. Positive psychology spends its research looking at the positive side of things and how they go right rather than the pessimistic side.

=== Psychology of science ===
In 1966, Maslow published a pioneering work in the Psychology of science, The Psychology of Science: A Reconnaissance, the first book ever actually titled 'psychology of science'. In this book Maslow proposed a model of 'characterologically relative' science, which he characterized as an ardent opposition to the historically, philosophically, sociologically and psychologically naıve positivistic reluctance to see science relative to time, place, and local culture.

Maslow acknowledged that the book was greatly inspired by Thomas Kuhn's The Structure of Scientific Revolutions (1962), and it offers a psychological reading of Kuhn's famous distinction between "normal" and "revolutionary" science in the context of his own distinction between "safety" and "growth" science, put forward as part of a larger program for the psychology of science, outlined already in his 1954 magnum opus Motivation and Personality. Not only that Maslow offered a psychological reading of Kuhn's categories of "normal" and "revolutionary" science as an aftermath of Kuhn's Structure, but he also offered a strikingly similar dichotomous structure of science 16 years before the first edition of Structure, in his nowadays little known 1946 paper "Means-Centering Versus Problem-Centering in Science" published in the journal Philosophy of Science.

=== Maslow's hammer ===
Abraham Maslow is also known for Maslow's hammer, popularly phrased as "if all you have is a hammer, everything looks like a nail" from his book The Psychology of Science, published in 1966.

== Criticism ==
Maslow's ideas have been criticized for their lack of scientific rigor. He was criticized as too soft scientifically by American empiricists. In 2006, author and former philosophy professor Christina Hoff Sommers and practicing psychiatrist Sally Satel asserted that, due to lack of empirical support, Maslow's ideas have fallen out of fashion and are "no longer taken seriously in the world of academic psychology". Positive psychology spends much of its research looking for how things go right rather than the more pessimistic view point, how things go wrong.

The hierarchy of needs has furthermore been accused of having a cultural bias—mainly reflecting Western values and ideologies. From the perspective of many cultural psychologists, this concept is considered relative to each culture and society and cannot be universally applied. However, according to the University of Illinois researchers Ed Diener and Louis Tay, who put Maslow's ideas to the test with data collected from 60,865 participants in 123 countries around the world over the period of five years (2005–2010), Maslow was essentially right in that there are universal human needs regardless of cultural differences, although the authors claim to have found certain departures from the order of their fulfillment Maslow described. In particular, while they found—clearly in accordance with Maslow—that people tend to achieve basic and safety needs before other needs, as well as that other "higher needs" tend to be fulfilled in a certain order, the order in which they are fulfilled apparently does not strongly influence their Subjective well-being (SWB). As put by the authors of the study, humans thus

can derive 'happiness' from simultaneously working on a number of needs regardless of the fulfillment of other needs. This might be why people in impoverished nations, with only modest control over whether their basic needs are fulfilled, can nevertheless find a measure of well-being through social relationships and other psychological needs over which they have more control.

— Diener & Tay (2011), p. 364

Maslow, however, would probably not be surprised by these findings, since he clearly and repeatedly emphasized that the need hierarchy is not a rigid fixed order as it is often presented:

We have spoken so far as if this hierarchy were a fixed order, but actually it is not nearly so rigid as we may have implied. It is true that most of the people with whom we have worked have seemed to have these basic needs in about the order that has been indicated. However, there have been a number of exceptions.

— Maslow, 'Motivation and Personality' (1970), p. 51

Maslow also regarded that the relationship between different human needs and behavior, being in fact often motivated simultaneously by multiple needs, is not a one-to-one correspondence, i.e., that "these needs must be understood not to be exclusive or single determiners of certain kinds of behavior".

Maslow's concept of self-actualizing people was united with Piaget's developmental theory to the process of initiation in 1993. Maslow's theory of self-actualization has been met with significant resistance. The theory itself is crucial to the humanistic branch of psychology and yet it is widely misunderstood. The concept behind self-actualization is widely misunderstood and subject to frequent scrutiny.

Maslow was criticized for noting too many exceptions to his theory. As he acknowledged these exceptions, he did not do much to account for them. Shortly prior to his death, one problem he tried to resolve was that there are people who have satisfied their deficiency needs but still do not become self-actualized. He never resolved this inconsistency within his theory.

=== Bias ===
Social psychologist David Myers has pointed out Maslow's selection bias, rooted in the choice to study individuals who lived out his own values. If he had studied other historical heroes, such as Napoleon, Alexander the Great, and John D. Rockefeller, his descriptions of self-actualization might have been significantly different.

== Legacy ==
Later in life, Maslow was concerned with questions such as, "Why don't more people self-actualize if their basic needs are met? How can we humanistically understand the problem of evil?"

In the spring of 1961, Maslow and Tony Sutich founded the Journal of Humanistic Psychology, with Miles Vich as editor until 1971. The journal printed its first issue in early 1961 and continues to publish academic papers.

Maslow attended the Association for Humanistic Psychology's founding meeting in 1963 where he declined nomination as its president, arguing that the new organization should develop an intellectual movement without a leader which resulted in useful strategy during the field's early years.

In 1967, Maslow was named Humanist of the Year by the American Humanist Association.

== Writings ==
- Maslow, A. H. (July 1943). "A theory of human motivation". Psychological Review. 50 (4): 370–396. doi:10.1037/h0054346. S2CID 53326433.
- Motivation and Personality (1st edition: 1954, 2nd edition: 1970, 3rd edition 1987)
- Religions, Values, and Peak Experiences, Columbus, Ohio: Ohio State University Press, 1964.
- Eupsychian Management, 1965; republished as Maslow on Management, 1998
- The Psychology of Science: A Reconnaissance, New York: Harper & Row, 1966; Chapel Hill: Maurice Bassett, 2002.
- Toward a Psychology of Being, (1st edition, 1962; 2nd edition, 1968; 3rd edition, 1999)
- The Farther Reaches of Human Nature, 1971
- Future Visions: The Unpublished Papers of Abraham Maslow by E. L. Hoffman (editor) 1996
- Personality and Growth: A Humanistic Psychologist in the Classroom, Anna Maria, FL: Maurice Bassett, 2019.

== See also ==
- Clayton Alderfer
- Mihaly Csikszentmihalyi
- Erich Fromm
- Frederick Herzberg
- Human Potential Movement
- Humanistic psychology
- Law of the instrument
- Manfred Max-Neef
- Rollo May
- Organismic theory
- Organizational behavior
- Positive disintegration
- Post-materialism
- Reverence
- Self-esteem
- Victor Vroom

== Sources ==
- Berger, Kathleen Stassen (1983). The Developing Person through the Life Span.
- Goble, F. (1970). The Third Force: The Psychology of Abraham Maslow. Richmond, CA: Maurice Bassett Publishing.
- Goud, Nelson (October 2008). "Abraham Maslow: A Personal Statement". Journal of Humanistic Psychology. 48 (4): 448–451. doi:10.1177/0022167808320535. S2CID 143617210.
- Hoffman, Edward (1988). The Right to be Human: A Biography of Abraham Maslow. New York: St. Martin's Press. ISBN 978-0-87477-461-0.
- Hoffman, E. (1999), Abraham Maslow: A Brief Reminiscence. In: Journal of Humanistic Psychology Fall 2008 vol. 48 no. 4 443-444, New York: McGraw-Hill
- Sommers, Christina Hoff; Satel, Sally (2006). One Nation Under Therapy: How the Helping Culture is Eroding Self-reliance. MacMillan. ISBN 978-0-312-30444-7.
