= Motivation and Personality =

1954 book by Abraham Maslow

- Cover of the first edition
- Author: Abraham Maslow
- Language: English
- Subject: Psychology
- Publisher: Harper & Brothers
- Publication date: 1954
- Media type: Print
- Pages: 411
- ISBN: 978-0-06-041987-5

Motivation and Personality is a book on psychology by Abraham Maslow, first published in 1954. Maslow's work deals with the subject of the nature of human fulfillment and the significance of personal relationships, implementing a conceptualization of self-actualization. Underachievers have a need for social love and affection, but a self-actualized person has these "lower" needs to be gratified and is able to pursue his or her own path towards self-actualization.

Maslow's book is perhaps the best known contemporary work on human needs. Maslow postulated a hierarchy of human needs stretching from basic physical needs at the bottom to spiritual or transcendental needs at the top.

In Motivation and Personality, Maslow argues that, in order for individuals to thrive and excel, a health-fostering culture must be created. Maslow is among the psychological theorists who believe that when parents fail to provide a safe, nurturing environment, their children will develop deep feelings of insecurity. Maslow believes that well-being causes people to freely express their inherent potentials.
