= Positive disintegration =

Theory of personality development

The theory of positive disintegration (TPD) is a theory of personality development developed by Polish psychologist Kazimierz Dąbrowski. Unlike mainstream psychology, the theory views psychological tension and anxiety as necessary for personal growth. These "disintegrative" processes are "positive", whereas people who fail to go through positive disintegration may stop at "primary integration", possessing individuality but nevertheless lacking an autonomous personality and remaining impressionable. Entering into disintegration and subsequent higher processes of development occurs through developmental potential, including over-excitability and hypersensitivity.

Unlike other theories of development such as Erikson's stages of psychosocial development, it is not assumed that even a majority of people progress through all levels. TPD is not a theory of stages, and levels do not correlate with age.

== Dąbrowski's theory ==
The development of the theory of positive disintegration began in Dąbrowski's earliest Polish works, as reflected in his 1929 doctoral thesis. His first work in English also contained seeds of the theory. His next major English work was his 1964 book Positive Disintegration. He proposed that the key to mental growth was having strong "developmental potential": a constellation of psychological factors often leading to the disintegration of existing psychological structures. These disintegrations allow the individual to voluntarily reorganize their priorities and values, leading to psychological growth.

Dąbrowski's theory of personality development emphasizes several major features, including that having a unique personality is not a universal trait: it must be created and shaped by the individual to reflect their own unique character. Personality develops as a result of developmental potential (DP), including overexcitability and the autonomous (third) factor; not everyone displays sufficient DP to move through the process of mental growth via positive disintegration.

Dąbrowski used a multilevel approach to describe the continuum of developmental levels seen in the population. In his theory, developmental potential creates crises characterized by strong anxieties and depressions (which he called psychoneurosis) that precipitate disintegrations. For personality to develop, initial integrations based on instinct and socialization must disintegrate through a process Dąbrowski called positive disintegration. He said that the development of a hierarchy of individual values and emotional reactions was a critical component in developing one's personality and autonomy; thus, in contrast to most psychological theories, emotions play a major role.

Emotional reactions guide the individual in creating their individual "personality ideal", an autonomous standard that acts as the goal of individual development. Individuals must examine their essence and develop their own unique personality ideal. Only then can they make existential choices that emphasize the aspects of self that are higher and "more myself", and inhibit those aspects that are lower or "less myself", based on their ideal personality; thus shaping their personality and creating an authentic self based upon the fundamental essence of the individual. Critical components of individual development include: self-education, subject-object, personality ideal, self-perfection, and autopsychotherapy.

=== Factors in personality development ===
Dąbrowski observed that most people live their lives in a state of "primary or primitive integration" largely guided by biological impulses ("first factor"), by uncritical endorsement and adherence to social conventions ("second factor"), or by both at once. He called this initial integration Level I. Dąbrowski observed that at this level, there is no true individual expression of the autonomous human self; the individual has no autonomous personality, and rather, they exhibit Nietzsche's idea of the herd personality. Individual expression at Level I is influenced and constrained by the first and second factors.

The first factor directs energy and talents toward self-serving goals that reflect the "lower instincts" and biological needs, as its primary focus is on survival and self-advancement. The second factor, the social environment (milieu) and peer pressure, constrains individual expression and creativity by encouraging mob mentality and discouraging individual thought and expression. The second factor externalizes values and morals, thereby externalizing conscience; social forces shape behavior. Behavior, talents and creativity are funneled into forms that follow and support the existing social milieu. As conscience is derived from an external social context, so long as social standards are ethical, people influenced by the second factor will behave ethically. However, if a society becomes corrupt, people strongly influenced by the second factor will not dissent. Socialization without individual examination leads to a rote and robotic existence (the "robopath" described by Ludwig von Bertalanffy). Individual reactions are not unique, as reactions are based on the social context. According to Dąbrowski, people primarily motivated by the second factor represent a significant majority of the general population.

Dąbrowski felt that society was largely influenced by these two factors and could be characterized as operating at Level I, where the external value system absolves the individual of actual responsibility. He also described groups of people who display a different developmental course—an individualized developmental pathway. Such people break away from an automatic, rote, socialized view of life (which Dąbrowski called negative adjustment) and move into, and through, a series of personal disintegrations. Dąbrowski saw these disintegrations as a key element in the overall developmental process. Crises challenge the status quo and cause people to review the self, their ideas, values, thoughts, ideals, etc.

If development continues, one goes on to develop an individualized, conscious and critically evaluated hierarchical value structure (called positive adjustment). This hierarchy of values acts as a benchmark by which all things are now seen, and behavior is directed by these internal values, rather than by external social mores. At these higher levels, individual values characterize an eventual second integration reflecting individual autonomy and the arrival of the individual's true personality; each person develops their own vision of how life ought to be and lives according to that vision. This is associated with strongly individualized approaches to problem solving and creativity. One's talents and creativity are applied in the service of these higher individual values and visions of how life could, and should, be. The person expresses their "new" autonomous personality energetically through action, art, social change, and so on.

=== Developmental potential ===
Advanced development is often seen in people who exhibit strong developmental potential. Developmental potential represents a constellation of features: it may be positive or negative, it may be strong or weak. If it is strong, the input of the environment is minimal. If it is weak, the environment will play a critical role. Many factors are incorporated into developmental potential but three major aspects are overexcitability, one's specific abilities and talents, and a strong drive toward autonomous growth (a feature Dąbrowski called the "third factor").

==== Overexcitability ====
The most evident aspect of developmental potential is overexcitability (OE), a heightened physiological experience of stimuli resulting from increased neuronal sensitivities. The greater the OE, the more intense the day-to-day experiences of life. Dąbrowski outlined five forms of OE: psychomotor, sensual, imaginational, intellectual, and emotional. These overexcitabilities, especially the last three, often cause a person to experience daily life more intensely and to feel the joys and sorrows of life more profoundly. Dąbrowski studied human exemplars and found that heightened overexcitability was a key part of their developmental and life experience. These people are steered and driven by their values and their experiences of emotional OE. Combined with imaginational and intellectual OE, these people have an intense and multilevel perception of the world.

Dąbrowski's notion of overexcitability appears to have been developed independently of Elaine Aron's highly sensitive person, as her approach is substantially different. (Note: Sensitive persons can certainly have mood disorders, but should not be mistaken for being chronically depressed only because of a pessimistic view of the future of the world or of their own abilities (a pessimism which may well be accurate, as in the case of depressive realism). Likewise, they do not have an anxiety disorder merely because they worry more than the nonsensitive, and they do not have a personality disorder (avoidant, dependent, obsessive-compulsive, etc.) merely because their unusualness has been present throughout their lives as an impediment to the cheerful, resilient functioning expected of most people most of the time... They cannot shut out the world's achingly subtle, fleeting beauty or its inexplicable cruelty and suffering. They must find their own meaning in it. —Aron (2006))

Although based in the nervous system, overexcitabilities are expressed psychologically through the development of structures that reflect the emerging autonomous self. The most important of these are "dynamisms"—the biological or mental forces that control behavior and development. As used by Dąbrowski, dynamisms are instincts, drives, and intellectual processes combined with emotions. With advanced development, dynamisms increasingly reflect movement toward personal autonomy.

==== Abilities and talents ====
The second aspect of developmental potential—specific abilities, and talents—tends to conform to the developmental level. At lower levels people use talents to support egocentric goals or to climb the social and corporate ladders. At higher levels, specific talents and abilities become an important force as the person uses their hierarchy of values to express, and achieve, their vision of their ideal personality and their view of how the world should be.

==== The third factor ====
According to Dąbrowski, the third factor of developmental potential (DP) is a drive toward individual growth and autonomy. He saw this as a critical factor in applying one's talents and creativity toward autonomous expression, and in providing motivation to strive for more and to try to imagine (and achieve) goals currently beyond one's grasp. Dąbrowski was clear to differentiate this third factor from free will. He felt that free will did not go far enough in capturing the motivating aspects that he attributed to this third factor, for example, an individual can exercise free will and show little motivation to grow or change as an individual. The third factor specifically describes motivation—a motivation to become one's own true self. This motivation is often so strong that a person can find that they must develop themself, despite putting themself in danger by doing so. This feeling of "I've gotta be me", especially when it is "at any cost", and is expressed as a strong motivator for self-growth, is beyond the usual conceptualization of free will.

Dąbrowski's theory says that a person whose DP is high enough will generally undergo disintegration, despite any external social or family efforts to prevent it; whereas person whose DP is very low will generally not undergo disintegration (or positive personality growth) even in a conducive environment.

==== Developmental obstacles ====
Dąbrowski called overexcitability "a tragic gift" to reflect that the road of the person with strong OE is not a smooth or easy one. Potentials to experience great highs are also potentials to experience great lows. Similarly, potentials to express great creativity come with the potential of experiencing a great deal of personal conflict and stress. This stress drives development and is a result of conflict—both socially and within oneself. Suicide is a significant risk in the acute phases of this stress, and the isolation often experienced at this stage may also heighten the risk of self-harm.

Dąbrowski advocated autopsychotherapy, educating the person about his theory and the disintegrative process to give them a context within which to understand their intense feelings and needs. Dąbrowski suggested giving people support in their efforts to develop and find their own self-expression. According to Dąbrowski, both children and adults with high DP (and OE) have to find and walk their own path, often at the expense of fitting in with their social peers and even with their families. At the core of autopsychotherapy is the awareness that no one can show anyone else the "right" path—everyone has to find their own path for themselves. Alluding to the knights on the Grail Quest, the Jungian analyst, Joseph Campbell allegedly said: "If a path exists in the forest, don't follow it, for though it took someone else to the Grail, it will not take you there, because it is not your path."

== Levels ==
The first and fifth levels of Dąbrowski's theory of Positive Disintegration are characterized by psychological integration, harmony, and little inner conflict. There is little internal conflict at Level I because at this level one can almost always justify their behavior—it is either for their own good and is therefore "right", or society endorses it and it is therefore "right". In either case, the individual confidently acts as they think anyone else would and does what everyone is "supposed to do". Dąbrowski compared this to Level V, where there is no internal conflict because what a person does is in harmony with their own internal sense of values. Regardless of internal conflict, external conflict can, and does, still occur.

Dąbrowski used Levels II, III, and IV to describe various degrees and types of disintegration. He was very clear that the levels he presents "represent a heuristic device". Accordingly, in the process of developing the structures, two or even three contiguous levels may exist side by side, although they exist in conflict. The conflict is resolved when one of the structures is eliminated, or comes under complete control of another structure.

=== Level I: Primary integration ===
The first level is called primitive or primary integration. People at this level are often influenced primarily by either the first factor (heredity/impulse), the second factor (social environment), or both. The majority of people at Level I are integrated at the environmental or social level (Dąbrowski called them average people). Dąbrowski distinguished the two subgroups of Level I by degree: "the state of primary integration is a state contrary to mental health. A fairly high degree of primary integration is present in the average person; a very high degree of primary integration is present in the psychopath." Marked by selfishness and egocentrism (both covert and explicit), those at level one generally seek self-fulfillment above all else, justifying their pursuits through a sort of "it's all about me" thinking. They adhere strongly to the phrase "the end justifies the means", and may disregard the severity of the "means". Many people who are considered "leaders" fall into this category.

The vast majority of people do not break down their primitive integration at all, and those who do after a relatively short period of disintegration, usually during adolescence and early youth, either reintegrate at level one, or partially integrate some of the functions of higher levels, but do not experience a transformation of their whole mental structure. Dąbrowski thought that primary integration in the average person could be of value as it is stable and predictable, and, when accompanied by kindness and good-will, could represent those who can provide support and stability to people experiencing disintegration.

=== Level II: Unilevel disintegration ===
The prominent feature of this level is an initial, brief, and often intense crisis, or series of crises. Crises are spontaneous and occur on only one level—though they may appear to be different choices, they are ultimately on the same, horizontal, level.

Unilevel disintegration occurs during developmental crises such as puberty or menopause, in periods of difficulty handling an external stressful event, or under psychological conditions such as nervousness and psychoneurosis. (Note: A more or less organized form of growth through positive disintegration. Lower psychoneuroses are predominantly psychosomatic in nature, higher psychoneuroses are highly conscious internal struggles whose tensions and frustrations are not anymore translated into somatic disorders. —Dąbrowski, Kawczak & Piechowski (1970) via A glossary of Dabrowski's terms and concepts.) Unilevel disintegration occurs on a single structural and emotional level; there is a prevalence of automatic dynamisms with only slight self-consciousness and self-control.

Horizontal conflicts produce ambitendencies and ambivalences: one is equally attracted by different but equivalent choices (ambitendencies) and is not able to decide what to do as they have no real preference between the choices (ambivalences). Ultimately, if developmental forces are strong enough, the person is thrust into an existential crisis as their social rationales no longer account for their experiences and there is no alternative explanation. During this phase, existential despair is the predominant emotion. The resolution of this phase begins as individually chosen values start to replace rote, ingrained, social mores and are integrated into a new hierarchy of personal values. These new values often conflict with the person's previous social values. Many of the status quo explanations for the "way things are", learned through education and society, collapse under this scrutiny. This causes additional conflicts focused on the person's analysis of their reactions to the world at large and the behavior of themself and others. Common behaviors, and the ethics of the prevailing social norm, come to be seen as inadequate, wrong or hypocritical; positive maladjustment prevails. For Dąbrowski, these crises represent a strong potential for development toward personal growth and mental health. Using a positive definition, mental health reflects more than social conformity: it involves a careful, personal examination of the world and of one's values, leading to the development of an individual personality.

Level II is a transitional period. Dąbrowski said a person will either fall back (reintegration on a lower level), move ahead to Level III, or the crises will end negatively, in suicide or psychosis. The transition from Level II to Level III involves a fundamental shift that requires a phenomenal amount of energy. This period is the crossroads of development, from here one must either progress or regress. The struggle between Dąbrowski's three factors reflects this transitional crisis: "Do I follow my instincts (first factor), my teachings (second factor) or my heart (third factor)?" The developmental answer is to transform one's lower instincts (automatic reactions like anger) into positive motivation, to resist rote and social answers, and to listen to one's inner sense of what one ought to do.

=== Level III: Spontaneous multilevel disintegration ===
Level III describes a new type of conflict—a vertical conflict between two alternatives that are not simply different, but that exist on different levels; one is genuinely higher and the other lower. These vertical conflicts initially arise from involuntary perceptions of higher versus lower choices in life. In the words of G. K. Chesterton: "You just look at something, maybe for the 1000th time, and it strikes you—you see this one thing differently and once you do, it changes things. You can no longer 'go back and see it the way you did before.'" Dąbrowski called this vertical dimension multilevelness, and saw it as a gradual realization of the "possibility of the higher" (a phrase Dąbrowski used frequently), and of the contrasts between the higher and the lower in life. These vertical comparisons often contrast the lower, actual, behavior of a person with the higher, imagined ideals, and to alternative idealized choices. Dąbrowski believed that the authentic individual would choose the higher path as the clear and obvious one to follow, erasing the ambivalences and ambitendencies of unilevel conflicts. If the person's actual behavior subsequently falls short of the ideal, internal disharmony and a drive to review and reconstruct one's life will often follow. Multilevelness thus represents a new and powerful type of conflict that drives development.

Vertical conflicts are critical in leading to autonomy and advanced personality growth. (Note: Disintegration is multilevel (or vertical) if there are conflicts between higher and lower levels of instinctive, emotional or intellectual functions, e.g., higher and lower forms of the sexual instinct or the instinct of self-preservation, etc. It consists mainly in differentiation and hierarchization of various levels of functions with a tendency towards gradual stabilization of a new hierarchy. In the course of positive multilevel disintegration primitive, animalistic drives and structures are subject to disintegration, that is, weakening, loosening and even total destruction under the impact of developmental dynamisms (cf.) and gradually give way to new, higher levels and new, higher structures. There is a growth of consciousness of inner conflicts, self-consciousness, and self-control. The processes of inner psychic transformation gain in intensity and authenticity (cf.). There is a gradual build-up of the inner psychic milieu (cf.) with its main dynamisms such as "subject-object" in oneself, the third factor, inner psychic transformation, autonomy and authentism, and the personality ideal. —Dąbrowski, Kawczak & Piechowski (1970) via A glossary of Dabrowski's terms and concepts.) If the person is to achieve higher levels, the shift to multilevelness must occur. If a person does not have the developmental potential to move into a multilevel view, then they will fall back from the crises of Level II to reintegrate at Level I. In the shift to multilevelness, the horizontal (unilevel) stimulus-response model of life is replaced by a vertical and hierarchical analysis. This vertical view becomes anchored by the individual's emerging value structure, and all events are now seen in relation to their ideal values and how they want to live their life. As events in life are seen in relation to this multilevel, vertical view, it becomes impossible to support positions that favor a lower course of action when higher goals can be imagined and identified.

=== Level IV: Directed multilevel disintegration ===
In Level IV the person takes full control of their development. The involuntary spontaneous development of Level III is replaced by a deliberate, conscious, self-directed review of life from the multilevel perspective. This level marks the emergence of the third factor, described by Dąbrowski as an autonomous factor "of conscious choice (valuation) by which one affirms or rejects certain qualities in oneself and in one's environment." The person consciously reviews their existing belief system and tries to replace lower, automatic views and reactions with carefully thought out, examined and chosen ideals. These new values will increasingly be reflected in the person's behavior. Behavior becomes less reactive, less automatic and more deliberate as choices increasingly fall under the influence of the person's higher, chosen, ideals.

Social mores are reviewed and may be consciously re-accepted and internalized, or rejected and replaced by a self-determined alternative value system. One's social views come to reflect a deep responsibility based on both intellectual and emotional factors. At the highest levels, "individuals of this kind feel responsible for the realization of justice and for the protection of others against harm and injustice. Their feelings of responsibility extend almost to everything." This perspective results from seeing life in relation to one's hierarchy of values (the multilevel view) and the subsequent appreciation of the potential of how life could, and ought to, be lived. Disagreements with a world operating at a lower level are expressed compassionately by doing what one can to help achieve the "ought".

Given their genuine, authentic, prosocial outlook, people achieving higher developmental levels also raise the level of their society; prosocial, as used here, is not just support of the existing social order. If the social order is lower and you are adjusted to it, then you also reflect the lower (negative adjustment in Dąbrowski's terms, a Level I feature). Here, prosocial means a genuine cultivation of social interactions based on higher values. These positions often conflict with the status quo of a lower society (positive maladjustment). In other words, to be maladjusted in a low-level society is a positive feature.

=== Level V: Secondary integration ===
The fifth level displays an integrated and harmonious character, but one vastly different from that at the first level. (Note: The integration of all mental functions into a harmonious structure controlled by higher emotions such as the dynamism of personality ideal, autonomy and authenticity. Secondary integration is the outcome of the full process of positive disintegration. —Dąbrowski, Kawczak & Piechowski (1970) via A glossary of Dabrowski's terms and concepts.) At this highest level, one's behavior is guided by conscious, carefully weighed decisions based on an individualized and chosen hierarchy of personal values. Behavior conforms to the person's inner standard of how life ought to be lived, and thus little inner conflict arises.

Level V is often marked by creative expression. Especially at Level V, problem solving and art represent the highest and most noble features of human life. Art captures the innermost emotional states and is based on a deep empathy and understanding of the subject, often human suffering and sacrifice are the subjects of these works. Truly visionary works, works that are unique and novel, are created by people expressing a vision unrestrained by convention. Advances in society, through politics, philosophy and religion, are therefore commonly associated with strong individual creativity and personal accomplishments.

== Applications in therapy ==
The theory of positive disintegration has an extremely broad scope with many implications. One central application applies to psychological and psychiatric diagnosis and treatment. Dąbrowski advocated a comprehensive, multidimensional diagnosis of the person's situation, symptoms and developmental potential. Accordingly, if the disintegration appears to fit into a developmental context, then the person is educated in the theory and encouraged to take a developmental view of their situation and experiences. Rather than being eliminated, symptoms are reframed to yield insight and understanding into life and the person's unique situation.

=== Importance of narratives ===
Dąbrowski illustrated his theory through autobiographies of and biographies about those who have experienced positive disintegration. The gifted child, the suicidal teen, or the troubled artist is often experiencing the features of TPD, and if they accept and understand the meaning of their intense feelings and crises, they can move ahead, not fall apart. The completion of an extensive autobiography to help the individual gain perspective on their past and present is an important component in the autopsychotherapy process. In this process, the therapist plays a very small role and acts more as an initial stimulus than an ongoing therapist. Dąbrowski asked clients to read his books and to see how his ideas might relate to their lives.

=== Autopsychotherapy ===
For Dąbrowski, the goal of therapy is to eliminate the therapist by providing a context within which a person can understand and help themself—an approach to therapy that he called autopsychotherapy. (Note: Psychotherapy, preventive measures, or changes in living conditions consciously applied to oneself in order to control possible mental disequilibrium. —Dąbrowski, Kawczak & Piechowski (1970) via A glossary of Dabrowski's terms and concepts.) The client is encouraged to embark on a journey of self-discovery, with an emphasis on looking for the contrast between what is higher versus what is lower within their personality and value structure. They are encouraged to further explore their value structure, especially as it relates to the rationale and justification of their positions; discrepancies between values and behavior are highlighted. The approach is called autopsychotherapy to emphasize the important role that the individual must play in their own therapy process and in the larger process of personality development. The individual must come to see themselves as being in charge of determining or creating their own unique personality ideal and value structure. This includes a critical review of the social mores and values they have learned.

Dąbrowski was very concerned about what he called one-sided development, (Note: Type of development limited to one talent or ability, or to a narrow range of abilities and mental functions. In such development the creative instinct and empathy appear absent. In exceptionally capable individuals their one-sided development may come under the control of a primitive disposing and directing center and in the extreme case may take the form of psychopathy or paranoia. —Dąbrowski, Kawczak & Piechowski (1970) via A glossary of Dabrowski's terms and concepts.) in which people display significant advanced development in only one aspect of life, usually intellectual. He believed that it is crucial to balance one's development.

=== Overexcitability ===
In describing overexcitability, Dąbrowski emphasized two main aspects: higher-than-average sensitivity, and higher-than-average responsiveness, of the nerves to stimuli. Dąbrowski explained, "The prefix 'over' attached to 'excitability' serves to indicate that the reactions of excitation are over and above average in intensity, duration and frequency." If someone has strong OE, they will need less stimuli to cause a reaction and the reaction will be stronger than an individual who does not demonstrate overexcitability.

Dąbrowski reminded clients that without internal unease there is little stimulus for change or growth. Rather than trying to rapidly ameliorate symptoms, this approach encourages individuals to fully experience their feelings and to try to maintain a positive and developmental outlook regarding what they may perceive as strong depression or anxiety. An emphasis is placed on the client becoming aware that they can consciously control the direction of their life and apply what Dabrowski called autopsychotherapy.

== Key ideas ==
Dąbrowski based his theory on certain key ideas:

- Lower animal instincts (first factor) must be inhibited and transformed into "higher" forces for people to be truly human as this ability to transform instincts is what separates people from other animals.
- The common initial personality integration, based upon socialization (second factor), does not reflect true personality.
- At the initial level of integration, there is little internal conflict as when one "goes along with the group", there is little sense of individual wrongdoing. External conflicts often relate to the blockage of social goals—career frustrations for example. The social mores and values prevail with little question or conscious examination.
- True personality must be based upon a system of values that are consciously and volitionally chosen by the person to reflect their own individual sense of "how life ought to be" and their "personality ideal"—the ideal person they feel they "ought to be".
- The lower animal instincts, the forces of peer groups, and socialization are inferior to the autonomous self (personality) consciously constructed by the person.
- To break down the initial integration, crises and disintegrations are needed, usually provided by life experience.
- These disintegrations are positive if the person can achieve positive and developmental solutions to the situation.
- "Unilevel crises" are not developmental as the person can only choose between equal alternatives, such as whether to go left or right.
- A new type of perception involves "multilevelness", a vertical view of life that compares lower versus higher alternatives and now allows the individual to choose a higher resolution to a crisis over other available, but lower, alternatives—the developmental solution.
- "Positive disintegration" is a vital developmental process.
- Developmental potential describes the forces needed to achieve autonomous personality development.
- Developmental potential includes several factors including innate abilities and talents, "overexcitability" and the "third factor".
- Overexcitability is a measure of an individual's nervous system's level of response.
- Overexcitability, or an overly sensitive nervous system, makes one prone to angst, depression and anxiety. Dąbrowski's calls these psychoneuroses—a very positive and developmental feature.
- The third factor is a measure of an individual's drive toward autonomy.
- When multilevel and autonomous development is achieved, a secondary integration is seen reflecting one's mature personality. The individual has no inner conflict; they are in internal harmony as their actions reflect their deeply felt hierarchy of values.

Dąbrowski's approach is of interest philosophically as it is Platonic, reflecting the bias of Plato toward seeing an individual's essence as a critical determinant of their developmental course in life. However, Dąbrowski also added a major existential aspect as well, one that depends upon the anxieties a person feels and on how they resolve the day-to-day challenges they face. According to Dąbrowski's theory, essence must be realized through an existential and experiential process of development. The characterization advanced by Kierkegaard of "Knights of faith" may be compared to Dąbrowski's autonomous individual.

Dąbrowski also reviewed the role of logic and reasoning in personal development and concluded that intellect alone does not fully help people know what to do in life. His theory incorporates Jean Piaget's views of development into a broader scheme guided by emotion, as the emotions one feels about something are the more accurate guide to life's major decisions.

== Secondary integration versus self-actualization ==
People have often equated Maslow's concept of self-actualization with Dąbrowski's idea of secondary integration, despite there being some major differences between the two ideas. Dąbrowski, a personal friend and correspondent of Maslow, rejected Abraham Maslow's description of self-actualization. Actualization of an undifferentiated self is not a developmental outcome in Dąbrowski's theory, whereas Maslow described self-actualization as a process where the self is accepted "as is", with both higher and lower aspects of the self being actualized. For Maslow, self-actualization involved "being all that one can be and accepting one's deeper self in all its aspects".

Dąbrowski instead applied a multilevel (vertical) approach to self. He spoke of the need to become aware of and inhibit and reject the lower instinctual aspects of the intrinsic human self, and to actively choose and assemble higher elements into a new unique self. Dąbrowski would have people differentiate the initial self into higher and lower aspects, and reject the lower and actualize the higher aspects to create their unique personality; Maslow would have people "embrace without guilt" all aspects.

Dąbrowski introduces the notion that although the lower aspects may initially be intrinsic to the self, people can develop a self-awareness of their lower nature and discover how they feel about these low levels. If they feel badly about behaving in these ways, they can cognitively and volitionally decide to inhibit and eliminate these behaviors; Dąbrowski called this personality shaping. In this way, the higher aspects of the self are actualized while the lower aspects are inhibited. For Dąbrowski, this inhibition is the unique aspect of humans that sets people apart from other animals—no other animal is able to differentiate their lower instincts and inhibit their animalistic impulses, an idea also expressed in Plessner's eccentricity.

== Dąbrowski and the gifted individual ==
An appendix to Dąbrowski (1967) reports the results of investigations done in 1962 where "a group of [Polish] gifted children and young people aged 8 to 23" were examined. Of the 80 youth studied, 30 were "intellectually gifted" and 50 were from "drama, ballet, and plastic art schools".

Dąbrowski found that every one of the children displayed overexcitability

Which constituted the foundation for the emergence of neurotic and psychoneurotic sets. Moreover it turned out that these children also showed sets of nervousness, neurosis, and psychoneurosis of various kinds and intensities, from light vegetative symptoms, or anxiety symptoms, to distinctly and highly intensive psychasthenic or hysterical sets.

Dąbrowski asked why these children would display such "states of nervousness or psychoneurosis" and suggested that it was due to the presence of OE.

Probably the cause is more than average sensitivity which not only permits one to achieve outstanding results in learning and work, but at the same time increases the number of points sensitive to all experiences that may accelerate anomalous reactions revealing themselves in psychoneurotic sets.

The association between OE and giftedness has been the topic of extensive research done by Michael Piechowski and colleagues Lysy and Miller. It appears that intellectual OE is a marker of potential for giftedness/creativity, and that other types of OE may be as well. Dąbrowski's thesis is that the gifted will disproportionately display this process of positive disintegration and personality growth.

== Criticism ==
For the last 40 years, efforts to measure Dabrowskian constructs have been limited to looking at overexcitability. The most widely known instrument is the Overexcitability Questionnaire—Two.

== Origins ==
Dąbrowski's worldview was likely influenced by his life experiences. As a teenager in World War I, he witnessed a major battle near his village. He walked among the bodies of the dead soldiers and later recalled that the looks on their faces were wildly different—some expressed fear, some horror, while some looked calm and peaceful.

During World War II, he was imprisoned by the Nazi police several times and his wife paid ransom for his release; when Stalin seized Poland, Dąbrowski and his wife were imprisoned for 18 months. Dąbrowski said he wrote his theory to encapsulate the lowest human behaviors he had observed during the war, as well as the highest acts of self-sacrifice. He said that no other psychological theory had captured this wide range of human behavior. After his release, his behavior was closely monitored by the Polish authorities until at least the early 60s. In 1965 he established a base in Edmonton, Alberta, and spent the rest of his life alternating between Canada and Poland.

== See also ==
- Anti-psychiatry
- Antifragility
- Eustress
- Lawrence Kohlberg's stages of moral development
- Michael Fordham § De-integration and re-integration
- Personality psychology
- Posttraumatic growth
- Role suction
