= Religions, Values, and Peak Experiences =

Book by Abraham Maslow

- Cover of the first edition
- Author: Abraham Maslow
- Language: English
- Subject: Psychology
- Publisher: Ohio State University Press
- Publication date: 1964
- Media type: Print

Religions, Values, and Peak Experiences is a 1964 book about psychology by Abraham Maslow. Maslow addressed the motivational significance of peak experiences in a series of lectures in the early 1960s, and later published these ideas in book form.

== Overview ==
In contrast with the preoccupation of Freudian psychopathology, Maslow insisted on a "psychology of the higher life" which was to attend to the question "of what the human being should grow toward." In his work, Maslow described the experience of one's life as meaningful as being based on a feeling of fulfillment and significance.

Maslow's theory of "peak-experiences" has been compared to William James' "healthy-minded" religion. Maslow hypothesized a negative relationship between adherence to conventional religious beliefs and the ability to experience peak moments.

In Religions, Values, and Peak Experiences, Maslow stated that the peak experience is "felt as a self- validating, self-justifying moment which carries its own intrinsic value with it." Furthermore, the person is the "creative center of his (or her) own activities."

== See also ==
- Maslow's hierarchy of needs
- Peak experience
