= Kazimierz Dąbrowski =

Polish psychologist, psychiatrist and physician (1902–1980)

- Grave of Kazimierz Dąbrowski in Zagórze, Poland, photographed in May 2026
- Born: Kazimierz Dąbrowski; 1 September 1902; Klarów, Poland
- Died: 21 November 1980 (aged 78); Warsaw, Poland
- Education: Poznan University, Geneva University
- Known for: Theory of Positive Disintegration
- Scientific career
- Fields: Psychiatry, Psychology, Medicine
- Workplaces: Institute of Mental Hygiene
- Thesis: Les Conditions Psychologique du Suicide (1929)
- Doctoral advisor: François Naville

Kazimierz Dąbrowski (1 September 1902 – 26 November 1980) was a Polish psychologist, psychiatrist and physician. He is known for his theory of "positive disintegration" as a mechanism in personality development. He was also a poet who used the pen name "Paul Cienin, Paweł Cienin".

== Biography ==
Kazimierz Dąbrowski was born into a Catholic family on a country estate near Lublin, in the Russian sector of Poland, the third son of four children to Antoni, an estate administrator, and his wife. When he was six, the youngest child, a daughter aged three, died of meningitis. Kazimierz was initially schooled at home. Later he attended "Stefan Batory" secondary school in Lublin. During World War I he was deeply shocked by the sight of the bodies of fallen soldiers strewn across a battlefield. At 16, having falsified his age, he gained access to the newly opened University of Lublin, where he attended the Polish language programme. At 18, he was admitted to Warsaw University to study Medicine. After two years he transferred to the University of Poznan where he attained a medical degree and had begun studies in psychology. He next moved on to the University of Geneva where he worked with Édouard Claparède and Jean Piaget and where in 1929 he gained a Phd with a thesis on suicide, under professor F. Naville. He gained a second Phd in psychology at the University of Poznan in 1931 as a broader development on the theme of self-harm, including asceticism and sadomasochism.

Around 1930 he had married for the first time. The marriage was short-lived as his wife died of tuberculosis in the mid-1930s. With help from the Rockefeller Foundation he was able to travel for post-doctoral studies in Europe and North America. From 1932 Dąbrowski spent about two years in Vienna undergoing an abbreviated psychoanalysis with Wilhelm Stekel, a former collaborator of Sigmund Freud. At the same time he did post-graduate studies in neurology with Otto Marburg, in developmental psychology with Karl Ludwig Bühler and his wife, Charlotte Bühler, also a psychology professor, and in Neurophysiology with the Austrian physician, Wilhelm Schlesinger. Circa 1935, after the death of his wife, he went to the USA.

In 1937 when he returned to Poland he opened an Institute for Mental Hygiene inspired by the movement in the USA and offered courses in the field. In 1940 Dąbrowski married for a second time. With his wife, Eugenia also a psychologist, he had two daughters. The marriage lasted to his death in Warsaw in 1980.

In 1942 Dąbrowski was arrested by the Gestapo and briefly held in Warsaw's Pawiak prison. From there he was taken to the Montelupich Prison in Kraków for several months until his release was negotiated by colleagues and he returned to Warsaw. He continued his clinical work as a sanatorium superintendent. The Germans restricted his work under close supervision. After the war, he resumed his psychiatric work and was able to travel once more to the USA.

On his return in 1949 he was accredited as a clinical psychologist by the University of Wrocław. However the Stalinist authorities closed down his Institute of Mental Hygiene that year on the grounds that it was the product of dangerous Western ideology. He and his wife were brought to trial and sentenced to a two year prison term. After the death of Stalin they were released and he returned to more modest clinical work and teaching. With a partial thaw in Soviet-Western relations, in 1964 he travelled to Canada with his family on a one year visiting professorship at the University of Alberta. He continued publishing and travelling abroad until forced to stop through ill-health in his late 70s.

== Career ==
Dąbrowski developed the theory of positive disintegration, which attempts to describe how personality development can progress as a result of accumulated difficult experiences. "Disintegration" refers to the abandonment of clusters of prior sensitivities and attitudes, based on learning from these events and perceptions. The resulting shift, if there is one, may be regarded as positive when the process has moved the personality to an increased capacity to contain such experiences and gain new perspectives.

Dąbrowski had a lifelong dedication to the field of psychology. He established a rehabilitation centre in Zagórze (near Kraków) for patients who suffered mental disorders after experiencing difficult life situations. Research at the facility supplied him with observations and data that helped shape his concepts.

== Concepts ==
Dąbrowski developed the theory of positive disintegration from a number of assumptions and concepts. His approach is philosophically based on Plato, reflecting his bias towards essence — an individual's essence is a critical determinant of his or her developmental course in life. Dąbrowski was also influenced by the existential belief that one depends upon anxieties felt and the manner of resolving day to day challenges. One's essence needs to be realized through an existential and experiential process of development. Dąbrowski's idea of the "autonomous individual" may be compared to the characterization advanced by Kierkegaard of his "Knights of faith".

Dąbrowski's concept of positive disintegration should not be confused with the Jungian concepts of "De-integration and re-integration" coined by his British contemporary, Michael Fordham. Although they may appear somewhat analogous, they are based on different personality hypotheses and there is no evidence they knew about each other.

=== Observations on giftedness ===
In an appendix to Dąbrowski (1967), results of investigations conducted in 1962 with Polish youth are reported. Specifically, "a group of gifted children and young people aged 8 to 23" were examined (p. 251). Of the 80 young people studied, 30 were "intellectually gifted" and 50 were from "drama, ballet, or art schools" (p. 251). Dąbrowski found that every one of the children displayed what he called his factor of overexcitability, OE, "which constituted the foundation for the emergence of neurotic and psychoneurotic sets. Moreover, it turned out that these children also showed sets of nervousness, neurosis, and psychoneurosis of various kinds and intensities, from light vegetative symptoms, or anxiety symptoms, to distinctly and highly intensive psychasthenic or hysterical sets" (p. 253). Dąbrowski asked why these children should display such "states of nervousness or psychoneurosis" and suggested that it was due to the presence of OE (p. 255). "Probably the cause is more than average sensitivity which not only permits one to achieve outstanding results in learning and work, but at the same time increases the number of points sensitive to all experiences that may accelerate anomalous reactions revealing themselves in psychoneurotic sets" (p. 255).

Dąbrowski's posited association between OE and "giftedness" appears to be supported in other research, conducted primarily by Michael Piechowski and his colleagues. It appears that at the least OE is a marker of potential for giftedness/creativity. OEs can help teachers and others spot a gifted person. Dąbrowski's basic message is that giftedness might be disproportionately associated with a process of positive disintegration and personality growth.

== Main works ==
- Nerwowość dzieci i młodzieży (1935) (Nervousness of children and adolescents)
- Społeczno-wychowawcza psychiatria dziecięca (1959) (Socio-educational child psychiatry)
- O dezintegracji pozytywnej (1964) (About positive disintegration)
- Positive Disintegration (1964)
- Personality-Shaping through Positive Disintegration (1967)
- Mental Growth through Positive Disintegration (1970)
- Psychoneurosis Is Not an Illness (1972)
- Existential Thoughts and Aphorisms (1972) (as Paul Cienin)
- Fragments from the Diary of a Madman (1972) (as Pawel Cienin ) poetry collection
- Myśli i aforyzmy egzystencjalne (1972) (as Paweł Cienin) (Thoughts and existential aphorisms)
- The Dynamics of Concepts (1973)
- Trud istnienia (1975) (The Effort to exist)
- Dezintegracja pozytywna (1979) (Positive Disintegration)
- W poszukiwaniu zdrowia psychicznego (1989) (In Search of Mental Health)

== Bibliography ==
- R. Zaborowski, Kazimierz Dąbrowski – l’homme et son œuvre in: Annales du Centre Scientifique à Paris de l’Académie Polonaise des Sciences 9, 2006, pp. 105–122
- DEZINTEGRACJA.PL - the Polish website dedicated to Kazimierz Dąbrowski and his Theory of Positive Disintegration
- Kobierzycki, Tadeusz. 'Kazimierz Dąbrowski' - biography in English, Heksis 1/3 (22-24) 2000
- Quarterly Heksis, Issue 1/2010 dedicated Kazimierz Dąbrowski's Theory of Positive Disintegration - http://www.heksis.com
- Be Greeted; a poem written by Dąbrowski.
- A. A. Zych, Higiena psychiczna w Polsce. Słownik biograficzny. (Mental Hygiene in Poland. Biographical Dictionary), Wrocław: Wyd. Nauk. DSW, 2013, pp. 60–67.
- Dąbrowski, K. (1964). Positive Disintegration. Maurice Bassett, 2016
- Tillier, William. Personality Development through Positive Disintegration: The Work of Kazimierz Dabrowski. Maurice Bassett, 2018

== See also ==
- Michael Fordham#De-integration and re-integration
- Edgar Morin
- Emergence
