= Peak experience =

Concept in psychology

A peak experience is an altered state of consciousness characterized by euphoria, often achieved by self-actualizing individuals. The concept was originally developed by psychologist Abraham Maslow in mid-1940s and term was coined by him in 1956 (see "History" below). According to T. Landsman, "Maslow described them [peak experiences] as rare, exciting, oceanic, deeply moving, exhilarating, elevating experiences that generate an advanced form of perceiving reality, and are even mystic and magical in their effect upon the experimenter." There are several unique characteristics of a peak experience, but each element is perceived together in a holistic manner that creates the moment of reaching one's full potential. Peak experiences can range from simple activities to intense events; however, it is not necessarily about what the activity is, but the ecstatic, blissful feeling that is being experienced during it.

== History ==
Peak experiences were originally presented by Abraham Maslow in September, 1956 at annual American Psychological Association convention and published in his first and principal paper on the subject, which were later reprinted in the book.

This paper is an attempt to generalize in a single description some of these basic cognitive happenings in the B-love experience, the parental experience, the mystic or oceanic, or nature experience, the aesthetic perception, the creative moment, the therapeutic or intellectual insight, the orgasmic experience, certain forms of athletic fulfillment. These and other moments of highest happiness and fulfillment I shall call the peak-experiences.

— Maslow A.H.

By choosing term Maslow attempted to denominate those experiences which have generally been identified as religious experiences and whose origins have, by implication, been thought of as supernatural. He emphasized importance of this even before the exact term was introduced:

It is quite important to dissociate this experience from any theological or supernatural reference, even though for thousands of years they have been linked. None of our subjects spontane ously made any such tie-up, although in later conversation some semireligious conclusions were drawn by a few, e.g., “life must have a meaning,” etc. Because this experience is a natural experience, well within the jurisdiction of science, it is probably better to use Freud’s term for it, e.g., the oceanic feeling. (Note: In 2nd edition of Motivation and Personality (1970) Maslow replaced Freud's term "oceanic feelings" with "peak experiences" in this chapter.)

— Maslow A.H.

In book Religions, Values, and Peak Experiences (1964) Maslow demonstrated that every "known high religion" is necessary associated with peak experiences:

The high religions call themselves revealed religions and each of them tends to rest its validity, its function, and its right to exist on the codification and the communication of this original mystic experience or revelation from the lonely prophet to the mass of human beings in general. But it has recently begun to appear that these "revelations" or mystical illuminations can be subsumed under the head of the "peak-experiences" or "ecstasies" or "transcendent" experiences which are now being eagerly investigated by many psychologists.

— Maslow A.H.

Maslow's assertions about peak experience, along with his famous hierarchy of needs, were widely celebrated due to the theories' focus on the psychology of healthy people, which stood out in a time where the bulk of psychology research focused on psychological disorders.

In original peak experience research, Maslow utilized interviews and questionnaires to gather participants' testimonies of peak experience. These early studies suggested common triggers for peak experience including art, nature, sex, creative work, music, scientific knowledge, and introspection.

== Characteristics ==
According to Maslow, often-reported emotions in a peak experience include "wonder, awe, reverence, humility, surrender, and even worship before the greatness of the experience", and reality is perceived with truth, goodness, beauty, wholeness, aliveness, uniqueness, perfection, completion, justice, simplicity, richness, effortlessness, playfulness, and self-sufficiency.

An individual in a peak experience will perceive the following simultaneously:

- loss of judgment to time and space
- the feeling of being one whole and harmonious self, free of dissociation or inner conflict
- the feeling of using all capacities and capabilities at their highest potential, or being "fully functioning"
- functioning effortlessly and easily without strain or struggle
- feeling completely responsible for perceptions and behavior. Use of self-determination to becoming stronger, more single-minded, and fully volitional
- being without inhibition, fear, doubt, and self-criticism
- spontaneity, expressiveness, and naturally flowing behavior that is not constrained by conformity
- a free mind that is flexible and open to creative thoughts and ideas
- complete mindfulness of the present moment without influence of past or expected future experiences

== Peak experience and self-actualization ==
Self-actualization is a concept developed by Abraham Maslow that is "to develop one’s potential, to become the person one was meant to be". During research on self-actualized people Maslow found that many subjects reported a similar unusual set of feelings, which prompted him to investigate peak experiences. After listing all 19 "characteristics of the cognition found in the generalized peak-experience" in his 1959 paper Maslow resumes interrelation between peak experience and self-actualizion:

In other words, any person in any of the peak experiences takes on temporarily many of the characteristics which I found in self-actualizing individuals. That is, for the time they become self-actualizers. [...]

This makes it possible for us to redefine self-actualization [...] We may define it as an episode, or a spurt in which the powers of the person come together in a particularly efficient and intensely enjoyable way, and in which he is more integrated and less split, more open for experience, more idiosyncratic, more perfectly expressive or spontaneous, or fully functioning, more creative, more humorous, more ego-transcending, more independent of his lower needs, etc. He becomes in these episodes more truly himself, more perfectly actualizing his potentialities, closer to the core of his Being.

— Maslow, Cognition of Being in the Peak Experiences (1959)

== Peak experience and flow ==
A common phenomenon to the peak experience called flow, was proposed by Mihaly Csikszentmihalyi in the 1975 book Beyond Boredom and Anxiety, partially based on Maslow's findings:

In my search for answers, three main fields of psychological literature seemed most promising. [...] The first field was writings on self-actualization and peak experiences: the work of psychologists like Abraham Maslow or accounts of ecstatic experiences such as provided by Marghanita Laski. These works contain detailed descriptions of the subjective feelings with which I had become familiar through the reports of artists. But these writings do not provide concrete explanations of what makes peak experiences possible.

— Csikszentmihalyi, Beyond Boredom and Anxiety (1975)

Flow has been described as a state of mind when one is completely immersed in their current activity:

Flow is defined as a subjective state that people report when they are completely involved in something to the point of forgetting time, fatigue, and everything else but the activity itself. In states of flow, a person is functioning at his or her fullest capacity. While flow experiences are somewhat rare, they occur under specific conditions; there is a balance between the person’s skills and the challenges of the situation, there is a clear goal, and there is immediate feedback on how one is doing. The experience of flow itself can be a powerful motivating force and can be an indication that, at least for the moment, one is experiencing self-actualization.

— Larsen & Buss, Personality Psychology: Domains of knowledge about human nature (2009)

Flow processes and peak experiences share several key characteristics (e.g. intense concentration, "centering of attention on a limited stimulus field", "altered time sense", "self-forgetfulness" and "need no goals or rewards external to itself"), but there are also some essential differences: e.g., while peak experience denotes a high level of stimulation or euphoria, flow is not associated with an increased level of stimulation.

== Examples ==
Most of the peak experiences had occurred during athletic, artistic, religious, or nature experiences, or during intimate moments with a friend or family member.

— Polyson J.

Think of the most wonderful experience of your life: the happiest moments, ecstatic moments, moments of rapture, perhaps from being in love, or from listening to music or suddenly 'being hit' by a book or painting, or from some creative moment.

— Maslow A.H.

Specific examples of when peak experiences often occur:

- Scientific discoveries; seeing or discovering some phenomenon for the first time
- Extreme sports activities – mountain biking, motorcycling, mountain/rock climbing, sky diving, snowboarding
- Musical talents – while playing an instrument alone, or with a group
- Childhood experiences – experiences with close friends and loved ones in the developmental phases of early life

== Implications ==
Abraham Maslow considered the peak experience to be one of the most important goals of life, as it is an indication of self-actualization. This moment of feeling wholly and completely the true self makes the peak experience an essential component of identity. The aftereffects of the peak experience leave the individual to see himself and the world in a new way. He views himself more positively, he views life as worthwhile and meaningful, and most importantly, he seeks to repeat the experience.

== Plateau experience ==
Maslow also recognized a related but distinct phenomenon of plateau experience. He wrote:

This is serene and calm rather than a poignantly emotional, climactic, autonomic response to the miraculous, the awesome, the sacralized, the Unitive, the B-values. So far as I can now tell, the high plateau-experience always has a noetic and cognitive element, which is not always true for peak experiences, which can be purely and exclusively emotional. It is far more voluntary than peak experiences are. One can learn to see in this Unitive way almost at will. It then becomes a witnessing, an appreciating, what one might call a serene, cognitive blissfulness which can, however, have a quality of casualness and of lounging about.

— Maslow A.H.

After Maslow's death, investigation into the nature of plateau experience per se "largely fizzled into obscurity." However, research into the related phenomena of self-transcendence and living transcendence is potentially increasing.

== See also ==
- Flow (psychology)
- Oceanic feeling
- Religions, Values, and Peak Experiences
- Born again
- Meditation
- Spirituality

== Sources ==
- Boniface, M.R. (2007). "Towards an understanding of flow and other positive experience phenomena within outdoor and adventurous activities". Journal of Adventure Education and Outdoor Learning. 1: 55–68. doi:10.1080/14729670085200071.
- Celestine, Nicole (2017). "Abraham Maslow, His Theory & Contribution to Psychology".
- Charlton, Bruce (1998). "Peak experiences, creativity and the Colonel Flastratus phenomenon."Abraxas vol. 14"". pp. 10–19.
- Csikszentmihalyi, Mihaly (1975). Beyond Boredom and Anxiety. San Francisco, Calif.: Jossey-Bass. ISBN 0-87589-261-2.
- Gruel, Nicole (2015). "The plateau experience: an exploration of its origins, characteristics, and potential" (PDF). The Journal of Transpersonal Psychology. 47 (1): 44–63.
- Hoffman, Edward (1988). The Right to be human: a biography of Abraham Maslow. Los Angeles New York: Jeremy P. Tarcher St. Martin's press. ISBN 0-87477-461-6.
- Hoffman, Edward; Ortiz, Fernando A. (2009). "Youthful Peak Experiences in Cross-Cultural Perspective: Implications for Educators and Counselors". In de Souza, M.; et al. (eds.). International Handbook of Education for Spirituality, Care and Wellbeing. Vol. 3. Dordrecht: Springer. pp. 469–489. doi:10.1007/978-1-4020-9018-9_26. ISBN 978-1-4020-9018-9.
- Krippner, Stanley (1972). "The plateau experience: A. H. Maslow and others". The Journal of Transpersonal Psychology. 4 (2): 107–120.
- Landsman, Ted (2002). "Peak experiences". In Craighead, Edward W.; Nemeroff, Charles B. (eds.). The Corsini Encyclopedia of Psychology and Behavioral Science. Vol. 3. John Wiley & Sons. pp. 1156−1158. ISBN 0-471-24098-2.
- Larsen, R. J.; Buss, D. M. (2009). Personality Psychology: Domains of knowledge about human nature (4 ed.). New York, NY: McGraw-Hill. ISBN 978-0070164994.
- Lowry, R. (1973). "Peak-experience". A.H. Maslow: An Intellectual Portrait. Monteray, California: Brooks/Cole Publishing Company. ISBN 0-8185-0083-2.
- Maslow, Abraham H. (1954). "Self-Actualizing People: a Study of Psychological Health". Motivation and Personality (1 ed.). New York: Harper & Brothers.
- Maslow, Abraham H. (1959). "Cognition of Being in the Peak Experiences". The Journal of Genetic Psychology: Research and Theory on Human Development. 94 (1): 43–66. doi:10.1080/00221325.1959.10532434. PMID 13641628.
- Maslow, Abraham H. (1962). Toward a Psychology of Being. Princeton, NJ: Van Nostrand-Reinhold. doi:10.1037/10793-000.
- Maslow, Abraham H. (1968). Toward a Psychology of Being (2 ed.). New York, NY: Van Nostrand-Reinhold. ISBN 978-0-442-03805-2.
- Maslow, Abraham H. (1970). "Self-Actualizing People: a Study of Psychological Health". Motivation and Personality (2 ed.). New York: Harper & Row. ISBN 978-0-06-044241-5.
- Maslow, Abraham H. (1970a). Religions, values, and peak experiences. New York: The Viking Press, Inc. ISBN 978-0-670-00304-4.
- Messerly, John G. (2017). "Summary of Maslow on self-transcendence". Reason and Meaning.
- Polyson, J. (1985). "Student's peak experiences: A written exercise". Teaching of Psychology. Vol. 12. pp. 211–213.
- Privette, G. (1983). "Peak experience, peak performance and flow: A comparative analysis of positive human experiences". Journal of Personality and Social Psychology. 45 (6): 1361–1368. doi:10.1037/0022-3514.45.6.1361.
- Whaley, John; Sloboda, John; Gabrielsson, Alf (2008). "Peak experiences in music".
