= Richard Tedeschi =

American psychologist

- Born: 1950 (age 75–76)
- Education: Syracuse University, Ohio University
- Known for: Post-traumatic growth (PTG)
- Scientific career
- Fields: Psychology
- Workplaces: University of North Carolina School of Medicine

Richard Tedeschi (born 1950) is an American psychologist. He is also a professor of psychology and a consultant of the American Psychological Association. Tedeschi is noted for introducing the concept of Post-traumatic Growth (PTG).

== Biography ==
Tedeschi completed his B.A. in Psychology at Syracuse University in 1972. He then obtained his Ph.D. in Clinical Psychology at Ohio University in 1976. Tedeschi completed his clinical psychology internship at the University of North Carolina School of Medicine. He is currently working as a professor in the university's campus in Charlotte and teaches personality and psychotherapy. He also conducts research on trauma and post-traumatic growth. In 1987, he was visiting professor at the Newcastle University's Department of Psychology.

=== Works ===
Tedeschi has co-authored several books on bereavement and trauma. Along with Lawrence Calhoun, Tedeschi pioneered the concept of post-traumatic growth (PTG), which is a construct of positive psychological change. It holds that this change transpires as the outcome of an individual's struggle with a highly challenging, stressful, and traumatic incident. After the experience, such individual manifest a changed outlook in life and greater resilience to stress. This concept is part of the broader positive psychology theoretical framework that enables counsellors and psychotherapists to focus on strength and competencies of patients.

According Tedeschi and Calhoun, PTG can manifest in these domains: appreciation of life, relationship with others, new possibilities, personal strength, and spiritual change. They also explained that PTG maybe facilitated by the following mechanisms:

- Cognitive processing: The process of making sense of the trauma and integrating it into one's life narrative;
- Emotional Regulation: Managing negative emotions and reflecting on successes and possibilities;
- Disclosure: Articulating trauma and its effect;
- Narrative Development: Shaping the traumatic narrative and deriving hope from it; and,
- Service: Involvement in activities that benefit others.

Tedeschi was also a consultant for the American Psychological Association for the development of materials that cover trauma and resilience for psychologists.

=== Publications ===
- Helping Bereaved Parents (2004)
- Handbook of Posttraumatic Growth (2006)
- Posttraumatic Growth in Clinical Practice (2012)
- The Posttraumatic Growth Workbook (2016)
- Posttraumatic Growth: Theory, Research and Application (2018)
