= Overexcitability =

Psychology term

Overexcitability is a term introduced to current psychology by Kazimierz Dąbrowski as part of his theory of positive disintegration (TPD). Overexcitability is a rough translation of the Polish word 'nadpobudliwość', which translates literally to 'superstimulatability'. “The prefix over attached to ‘excitability’ serves to indicate that the reactions of excitation are over and above average in intensity, duration and frequency."

In his book Positive Disintegration, Dąbrowski uses the terms "hyperexcitability", "increased excitability", "overexcitability" and simply "excitability". He uses these terms interchangeably with nervousness.

Dąbrowski introduces these terms to describe a heightened physiological experience of stimuli resulting from increased neuronal sensitivities. He describes those who have hyperexcitability as showing "strength and perseveration of reactions incommensurate to their stimuli." Michael Piechowski noted that Dąbrowski used the term psychic overexcitability to "underline the enhancement and intensification of mental activity much beyond the ordinary".

== Five forms ==
There are five forms of overexcitability. These five forms are psychomotor, sensual, emotional, imaginational and intellectual.

Psychomotor: OE is a heightened excitability of the neuromuscular system. This manifests itself in a capacity for being active and energetic, a love of movement, a surplus of energy and an actual need for physical action.

Sensual: OE is an intensified experience of any type of sensual pleasure or displeasure emanating from one of the five senses, i.e. sight, smell, touch, taste, and hearing. It manifests as an increased appreciation of aesthetic pleasure such as music, language, and art, and delight from tastes, smells, textures, sounds, and sights. Conversely, extreme pain and disgust are experienced upon exposure to sensations perceived as unpleasant.

Intellectual: OE manifests itself as an extreme desire to seek understanding and truth, to gain knowledge, and to analyse and categorise information. Those high in Intellectual OE are commonly seen as intellectually gifted and have incredibly active minds. They are intensely curious, avid readers and keen observers. They frequently love thinking purely for the sake of thinking.

Imaginational: OE manifests as an intensified play of the imagination, causing a rich association of images, invention, fantasy, use of imagery and metaphor and elaborate dreams and visions. Often children high in Imaginational OE do not differentiate between truth and fiction, or are absorbed in their own private world with imaginary companions and dramatizations.

Emotional: OE is characterised by heightened, intense feelings, extreme experience of complex emotions, identification with others' feelings to the point of actual experience and strong sentimental expression. Other indications include physical response to emotional stimuli such as stomachaches when nervous and obsessive concern with death and depression. Emotionally overexcitable people have a strong capacity for deep relationships; they show strong emotional attachments to people, places, and things. They are empathetic, compassionate and extremely sensitive.

According to Dąbrowski, a person who manifests any given form of overexcitability and especially one who manifests several forms of overexcitability sees reality in a different, stronger and more multisided manner.

== Giftedness ==
A small amount of definitive research has led to the belief that intensity, sensitivity and overexcitability are primary characteristics of the highly gifted. The association between OE and giftedness appears to be borne out in the research. It appears that at the least OE is a marker of potential for giftedness/creativity. Dąbrowski's basic message is that the gifted will disproportionately display this process of positive disintegration and personality growth. The term "overexcitability" was popularized in the gifted education community by Michael M. Piechowski and Susan Daniels, who edited Living with Intensity. While this theory has been commonly accepted, other research disputes the concept of overexcitabilities and suggests that the five-factor model of personality, specifically openness to experience, better explains these heightened behaviors.

== See also ==
Sensory processing sensitivity
