= Dependency need =

Psychology concept

Dependency need is "the vital, originally infantile needs for mothering, love, affection, shelter, protection, security, food, and warmth." (Segen, 1992)

A dependency need is thought to be characterized by two components: (1) It is a real need of an organism, something that must be present in order for the organism to be able to thrive, (2) It is something that an individual cannot provide for him or herself. It is well known that infants have many dependency needs; some of these needs are obvious, others have only come to the attention of researchers as the result of epidemiological studies. The more obvious needs of infants include: adequate feeding, adequate watering, adequate cleaning, adequate shelter, and more specifically, keeping the infant's body temperature within the narrow range of normalcy.

On the other hand, it was not well known until the middle of the 20th century that infants also required the presence of warmth and affection, known as "maternal warmth". The greatest number of dependency needs seem to be encompassed in infancy, but dependency needs begin to change and decrease with age and maturity. This marked decrease in dependency needs as an individual gets older can be largely attributed to the notion that, as an individual gets older, he or she becomes capable of providing these things for him or herself. To some extent, these needs remain present even into adulthood. Even as adults, people have certain universal dependency needs that remain constant throughout the lifespan that they are not able to provide for themselves; these include: the need to belong, need for affection, as well as the need for emotional support. These needs can usually be met by partnership, in which both partners get used to depending on one another. If adults lack partnership, their needs can usually be met by family and/or friend relationships.

== Importance ==
Dependency need is an important psychological concept, encompassing the fields of psychological, evolutionary, and ethological theory. Need, in general, is a concept greatly studied in varying psychological fields, by psychologists with varying specialties. Need is particularly important to the area of personality psychology. The concept of need can be defined as a "state of tension within a person", and as the need is satisfied, the state of tension is reduced. (Larsen & Buss, 2008) It is thought that all individuals have needs, and that needs organize perceptions, guiding individuals to see what they want (or need) to see (Larsen & Buss). A physical or psychological need is capable of organizing action by compelling an individual to do what is necessary in order to fulfill such a need. (Larsen & Buss, 2008) After action has been taken to fulfill the need, the need subsides until it is again desired and recurs.

== History ==
It can be hypothesized that the concept of dependency need originated from the well-known psychologists Henry Murray and Abraham Maslow's ideas about needs. According to Murray, a need can be defined as a "potentiality or readiness to respond in a certain way under certain circumstances." (Murray, 1938) Murray purposed a list of fundamental human needs. Each need was thought to be associated with "(1) a specific desire or intention, (2) a particular set of emotions, and (3) specific action tendencies." (Larsen & Buss, 2008) Murray believed that human beings had their own hierarchy of needs, unique to each individual. (Larsen & Buss, 2008) It is thought that each individual's various needs exist at different levels of strength.

According to Maslow, the concept of need can be defined primarily by an individual's goals. (Larsen & Buss, 2008) Maslow was a firm believer of self-actualization, the process of becoming "more and more what one idiosyncratically is, becoming everything that one is capable of becoming." (Larson & Buss, 2008) Maslow believed that needs were hierarchically organized, with more basic needs found toward the bottom of the hierarchy and the self-actualization need at the top. The needs defined by Murray and Maslow (physiological needs, safety needs, belongingness needs, esteem needs, self-actualization needs) seem to correspond with the vital needs encompassed in the concept of dependency need.

== Attachment theory's relevance ==
Dependency needs can sometimes be associated with Attachment Theory. Attachment can be defined as a "deep and enduring emotional bond that connects one person to another across time and space." (Ainsworth, 1973; Bowlby, 1969) Attachment is thought to first occur between an infant and his or her primary caregiver. (Hetherington & Parke, 1999) Harry Harlow and his research in developmental psychology showed that attachment between infant and caregiver is vitally important to the psychological development of the infant and requires physical contact with a warm and responsive mother. (Larsen & Buss, 2008) These early experiences and reactions of the infants to the primary caregivers become working models for later adult relationships. (Larsen & Buss, 2008) Therefore, conclusions can be visibly drawn linking attachment and dependency need; vital, infantile needs for mothering, love, affection, shelter, protection, security, food, and warmth (dependency need) can stem from the type of interaction between that of an infant and his or her primary caregiver. Three types of attachment styles, securely attached, avoidantly attached, and ambivalently attached, can result from varying levels and styles of care a primary caregiver provides an infant.

== Further breakdown ==
Dependency needs can be categorized into biological needs and social needs.

=== Biological needs ===
Biological needs are basic survival needs, such as protection from harm, consumption of food, and regulation of body temperature; they are mechanisms used to promote and maintain proper body functioning.

=== Social needs ===
Social needs are "acquired psychological processes that activate emotional responses to particular need-relevant incentives." (Reeve, 2009) Need for eye contact, expression of positive emotions by caretakers or loved ones, and cuddling—anything that fosters a sense of emotional security—can be defined as a social need. There are four basic social needs: power, achievement, intimacy, and affiliation. People who have power needs look to gain dominance, achieve high statuses, and/or achieve high positions in their occupations, households, or social groups or organizations. These people look for leadership roles, and are usually happy and content when they are in control. People who have achievement needs are willing to seek out and accomplish tasks. The strive for achievement can develop strongly in children when influenced by their parents. Intimacy needs are linked to affiliation needs. Intimacy needs can be sought out and met when in close, personal relationships with others. Fulfillment of intimacy needs can help decrease an individual's chance of developing onset of depression, as well as help reduce an individual's fears of being rejected. Affiliation needs are people's needs to feel a sense of involvement and "belonging" within a social group; affiliation needs have to do more with the acceptance of behavior. It is human nature for people to want to be liked by others and get approval from them. It is also innate for people to want to maintain healthy and positive relationships with others around them.

=== Key contributors ===
There have been numerous theorists who have done research in relation to dependency need.

Robert Bornstein, a professor of psychology, researched certain levels of dependency needs, as well as personality disorders related to dependency needs, including dependent personality disorder (DPD) and histrionic personality disorder (HPD). Henry Murray's publication, Explorations in Personality (1938) describes differences and similarities between types of dependency needs.

As mentioned previously, Abraham Maslow was a key contributor to the establishment of a dependency need theory. His need theory, Maslow's Hierarchy of Needs, is thought to help a person achieve the unsatisfied needs of one's self. In his hierarchy, he outlined five needs crucial to human development and happiness across the lifespan; they are thought to occur in stages. The five stages include, physiological needs, safety needs, social needs, self-esteem needs, and self-actualization. Physiological needs are needs that everyone has to have in order to survive, such as air, food, water, and sleep. After a person has attained these physiological needs, he or she then focuses his or her attention to safety needs. Safety needs help an individual feel secure in order to make him or her feel safe, physically and emotionally. An example of this can be seen in people's choices of where they choose to live and work, and attaining medical insurance. After safety needs are met, social needs are the focus of attention. Social needs have to do with interactions with others (friends, family, romantic partners) and receiving love. After these needs have been met, one's self-esteem needs begin to arise. Esteem needs can be both internal and external. Having and achieving self-respect, receiving attention, and accomplishing achievements are examples of self-esteem needs. After one succeeds in the area of self-esteem, self-actualization needs are to be met. One's full potential as a person, his or her self-actualization, helps him or her keep developing as a person throughout the lifespan. (Maslow, 2002)

Another key contributor to the establishment of dependency need theory was Sigmund Freud's theory of psychosexual development.

Freud's theory of psychosexual development

Sigmund Freud came up with a five-stage theory that stated human beings are born with sexual energy; this energy was thought to develop in five stages (oral, anal, phallic, latency, and genital stages). The first stage, the oral stage, occurs from birth to two years of age. The key component of the oral stage is the child's fascination with his or her mouth, more specifically, putting items into his or her mouth, breast feeding, etc. The child is thought to get great pleasure from such objects being placed in his or her mouth. The second stage, the anal stage, occurs from 18 months of age to three years. In this stage, the child's main focus is on his or her anus, and the experience of toilet training is thought to be quite pleasurable. The third phase, the phallic stage, occurs from three to six years of age. In this stage, the main focus of the child is on discovering his or her genital region. Children become more aware of their own bodies, the bodies of other children, as well as their parents' bodies. Children also become aware of anatomical sex differences between male and female genitalia. Freud believed during this stage, that boys had the idea that they needed to compete with their fathers in order to possess their mothers. He also believed that girls felt penis envy towards males, and therefore blamed their mothers for not having a penis; the girls then competed for psychosexual possession of their fathers. The fourth stage, the latency stage, occurs from six years of age until the child reaches puberty. In this stage, children are thought to be "latent" of sexual energies, however sexual urges still remain. During this time, children play with the same sex friends. The final stage in psychosexual development is the genital stage, occurring from puberty through the rest of adulthood. In this stage, individuals focus on detaching from their parents, doing their own thing and not relying as much on their parents. In this stage, genitalia is the main focus and sexual energy and urges are normal. The person's concern is now focused on mature, adult friendships and family relationships, as well as intimate relationships, and adult responsibilities. (Basic, 2011)

There are differences and similarities worth noting when it comes to biological needs and social needs. Biological needs are required for survival in everyday life, whereas social needs are acquired and learned. Similarities between the two include the relevance that an individual requires both types of needs in one's life in order to live happy, healthy lives in which he or she is able to thrive and succeed; if an individual's needs are not met, he or she may become sad and/or depressed.

== What happens when dependency needs are not met ==
A person's vital needs for mothering, love, affection, shelter, protection, security, food, and warmth are ever so important to an individual. If these dependency needs are not met, particularly when an individual is younger, emotional, psychological, as well as physical problems may result down the road. Also, intellectual disability or even death can result in extreme cases of neglect of dependency needs (usually in cases when biological needs are neglected). In general, depression, sadness, and loneliness are likely results if dependency needs are not met, regardless of the individual's age.

== Key experiments ==
Many experiments relating the importance of dependency need have been conducted over the years; here, three influential experiments are outlined.

=== Harry Harlow monkey experiment ===
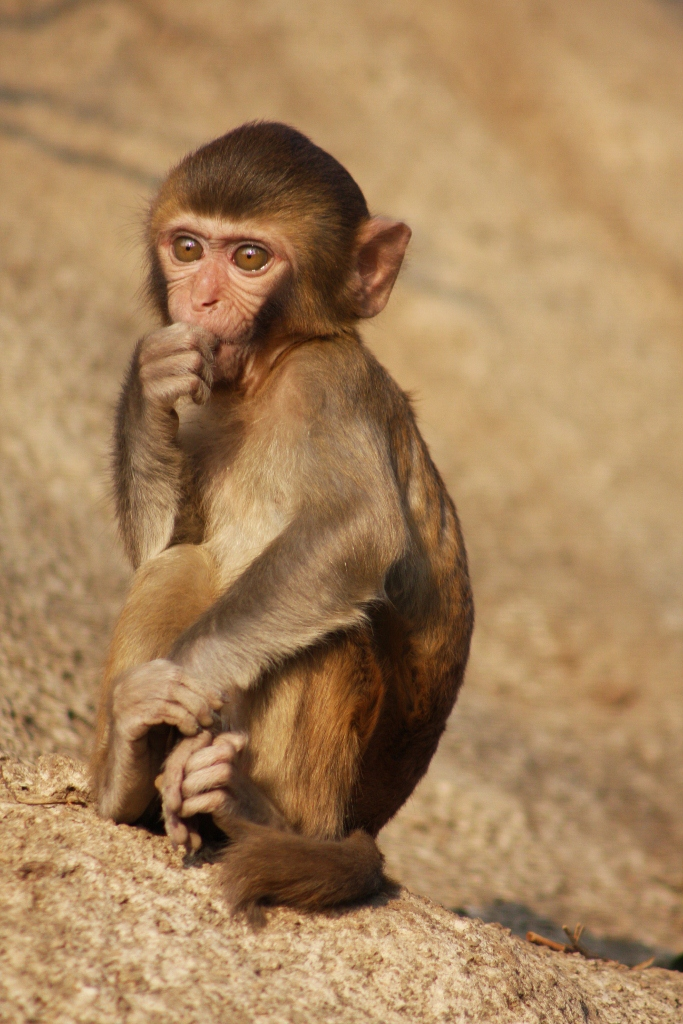
Harlow exclusively used rhesus macaques in his experiments.

When this study was conducted in 1957, Harry Harlow was questioning current theories about dependency and love. At this time, Harlow and his team stated that love began developing as a feeding bond between an infant and its mother; this notion applied to family members, as well. It was also thought that humans, along with other social animals, lived in organized societies in order to regularize sexual contact. Harlow, being fascinated with the concept of love and nurturing, worked with monkeys to test these theories. (Berger, 2005)

In Harlow's monkey experiment, newborn monkeys were separated from their mothers almost immediately after birth. They were then raised with substitute "mothers" made of either (1) wire or (2) wood covered with a soft cloth. In one of the experiments, both the wire and wood mothers were presented to the infant monkey in the same cage, and only one wore a nipple, which the infant was able to nurse from. Some of the monkeys nursed from the wire mother, and others from the cloth mother. According to Berger, Harlow found that even when the wire mother was the source of food the infant monkey spent more of its time with the cloth surrogate. Harlow also found that the cloth mother provided not only food to the infant monkeys, but also was able to provide comfort and security for them. The interpretation made by Harlow about this was that the liking for the cloth surrogate mother showed the importance of affection, emotion, nurturing, and dependency in mother-child relationships.

=== René Spitz orphan study ===
The phenomenon of infant dependency need was first noticed in René Spitz's orphan study. It was during this study that researchers learned of the higher mortality rates for infants maintained in orphanages. When the obvious factors such as inadequate nutrition, contagious diseases, etc., were ruled out, researchers discovered that mortality rates could be greatly ameliorated by having the nurses in charge of the infants in the orphanages cuddle them in a way that approximated the amount of cuddling infants would normally receive from their own parents.

Spitz's orphan study focused on two groups of children, starting when the children were infants, and continued all the way until they reached 12 years of age. The first group of children were raised in an orphanage; the children in this group only received minimal care, let alone any special, one-on-one time with a caregiver. In the second group, each infant received individual care from various women caregivers serving a prison sentence; these caregivers were with the children for the first year of their lives. When the children in each group turned two years old, dramatic differences occurred between them.

Results from the experiment showed drastic differences. It was found that children raised in the orphanage, who had received minimal care, had less developmental progress than children raised in the prison. Only 26 kids could walk, and only a few could talk. Some of the orphanage kids had signs of intellectual disability and were psychologically and socially underdeveloped for their age. Whereas in the prison group, most all the children had reached the point of full development for their age division.

Defined previously, dependency needs are "The vital, originally infantile needs for mothering, love, affection, shelter, protection, security, food, and warmth" (Segen, 1992). When those needs are not met psychological, emotional, physical and attachment problems can arise. This was shown in the Spitz orphan study. (Shepard, 2013)

=== Types of attachment ===
"Attachment theory states that a child's first relationship is a love relationship that will have profound, long-lasting effects on an individual's subsequent development." (Colin, 1991) The closeness of the child to the person providing protection and a sense of security will bond this figure to the child. This figure lays the foundation for the child to be able to form other secure relationships in the future. There are four main types of attachment, including: secure, anxious/avoidant, anxious/ambivalent and disorganized/disoriented.

In securely attached babies, the baby's attachment figure is an effective secure base from them. They are able to explore the world and can even handle brief separation in an environment unfamiliar to them. They are secure in the fact that they know the attachment figure will return and that there is little to no anxiety experienced. (Colin, 1991)

In anxious/avoidant attachment, the baby is anxious about the attachment figure's (typically a parent) responsiveness. The baby then develops a defensive strategy for managing his or her own anxiety. The baby experiencing this situation has very little, to no confidence in relation to being responded to; so when the baby seeks care, the child expects to be rejected. For example, if the baby is hungry, he or she will not tell anyone/cry because he or she doesn't expect anyone to meet this need. (Colin, 1991)

In anxious/ambivalent attachment, signs of anxiety, anger, and mixed feelings about the attachment figure are present in the baby; this is especially true after brief separations of the baby from the attachment figure, occurring in unfamiliar environments. (Colin, 1991)

In disorganized/disoriented babies, the baby does not have a consistent strategy for managing separation and reunion with his or her attachment figure. Some of the babies show to be depressed, demonstrate avoidant behavior, express anger, and/or show disturbing behaviors. Infants in this category have typically been maltreated. (Colin, 1991)

== Today and future ==
=== Current research ===
The research currently being done in the last few years in relation to dependency need relates largely to attachment theory. Most studies of attachment theory focus on how attachment relates to other aspects in the individual's life; for example, how an individual's attachment style (developed early on) affects his or her display of emotions after a break-up, or how an individual's attachment style affects his or her ability to make new friends in college.

A study done in 2010 by Stephanie Parade, Esther Leerke, and Nayena Blankson looked at the correlation between an individual's attachment to his or her parents and how well he or she is able to make friends; this study specifically focused on college-age individuals. The study also looked at social anxiety as the mediator. The results of this study show the more securely attached a person is to his or her parents; the easier it is for him or her to make friends. These findings are consistent with Bowlby's proposition. The authors also found that social anxiety only showed up in the minority. The participants in the minority group had less social anxiety when they had a secure relationship with their parents, which in turn helped them be more sociable overall. (Parade, Leerke, & Blankson, 2010)

Another current study done by Gnilka, Ashby, and Noble, looked at "adult attachment styles and the psychological outcomes, like hopelessness and life satisfaction, using maladaptive and adaptive perfectionism as the mediators." (Gnika, Ashby, & Noble, 2013) The results show that having high levels of avoidant or anxiety attachment will cause low maladaptive perfectionism, which overall makes one more likely to have low life satisfaction and high levels of hopelessness. These findings can benefit counselors when working with patients who have problems with perfectionism.

==== Relationship to female suicide attempts ====
Little research occurs in this field today. One article, done in 1995, looked at female suicide and dependency needs. The focus of the article was on the dependency needs of female adolescent suicide attempters and non-attempters. It also looked at other social network and intimate relationships for both suicide attempters and non-attempters. The authors hypothesized that dependency needs would be higher in suicide attempters. The results displayed a similarity in both groups, although, the sample size was too small to generalize to attempters. The article suggests future research on the range of dependency and the effect dependency might have on suicide. (Beettridge & Favreau, 1995)

=== Viability ===
In the last decade, research on the topic of dependency need has been declining. The theory of dependency need has largely been incorporated into attachment theory.

== Conclusions ==
Vital, originally infantile needs for mothering, love, affection, shelter, protection, security, food, and warmth, more specifically known as "dependency needs", change and decrease with age and maturity. As an individual gets older, these needs usually decrease in strength and can normally be met individually, or fulfilled by relationships among partners, family members or friends.

By looking at historical research pioneered by Murray, Maslow, Freud, and Harlow, as well as more recent concepts developed by Spritz, Colin, Parade et al., Beettridge and Favreau, one can determine that dependency need is an important psychological concept, encompassed in many areas of psychology. Throughout time, the basic needs related to safety, love, affection, and protection have seemed to be a subject of utmost importance. No matter the way one theorizes the concept of dependency need, it is well known that all humans seem to have these basics needs. It is also known that if these needs are somehow not adequately met, the person who has been neglected in this way, will likely develop deep-seated emotional, psychological, and possibly even physical hardships.

Today, the concept of dependency need is largely interrelated with the concept of attachment theory. Nowadays, a lot of attachment theory studies are interested in seeing if there is a relationship between a person's style of attachment (developed in infancy) and the way in which he or she deals with whatever life throws his or her way (years later); i.e., dealing with emotions after a break-up or making friendships in college. Conclusions can be visibly drawn linking attachment and dependency need; vital, infantile needs for mothering, love, affection, shelter, protection, security, food, and warmth (dependency need) can stem from the type of interaction between that of an infant and his or her primary caregiver. Attachment theory can also go beyond infancy to look at how early interactions have shaped an individual's personality, and how he or she deals with life situations years and years down the road. Dependency need continues to be a concept that is of great interest to psychologists (more specifically tied into attachment theory) and is ever-present in the everyday lives of all human beings.
