= Motivational speaker =

Speaker intended to motivate the audience

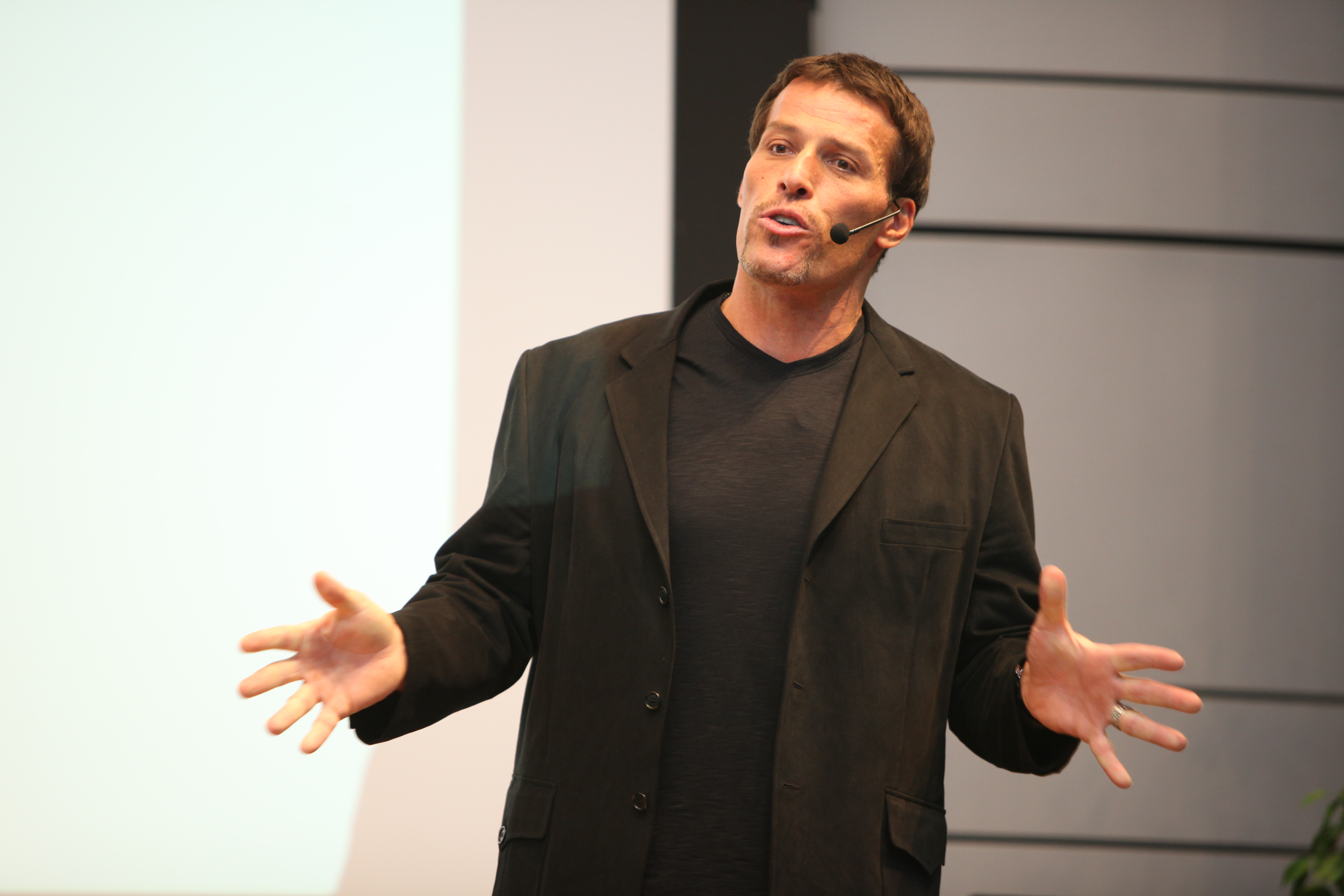
Motivational speaker Tony Robbins in 2009

A motivational speaker (or inspirational speaker) is a speaker who makes speeches intended to motivate or inspire an audience. Such speakers may attempt to challenge or transform their audiences.

Motivational speakers can deliver speeches at schools, colleges, places of worship, companies, corporations, government agencies, conferences, trade shows, summits, community organizations, and similar environments.

== Early motivational speakers ==
One of the earliest known motivational speakers credited for what was considered his revolutionary work was Ralph Waldo Emerson (1803–1882), an American essayist, poet, and philosopher.

== Techniques and theories ==
The two main theories for why motivational speakers may need to be externally searched out is to fill the need of content theory or the process theories.

The content theories were created by different psychologists, such as Abraham Maslow, Clayton Alderfer, Frederick Herzberg, and David McClelland. They focus on the inner workings and think of an individual and what will energize, stop behaviors, and keep it sustainable for long-term needs. These theories acknowledge that every individual is unique and has different needs in order to motivate them.

The process theories focus on the explanation and analysis of different people and what will energize, stop behaviors, and keep it sustainable for long-term needs. Brought into perspective by Victor Vroom, B. F. Skinner, Ruth Kanfer, and Albert Bandura, it addresses the needs of learning and expectancy and realizes that individuals will make choices based on reward and compensation.

Speakers try to show their audience about the positive outcomes that can happen in life and focus on the possible opportunities rather than the limits that people set for themselves. Using positively-connotative words rather than negative ones and gives charismatic verbal and non-verbal social cues. Using their posture, eye contact, body language, facial expressions, and by dressing appropriately they can engage with the audience in a non-verbal way. They can change the tone of their voice, speech pattern, accent, and pitch to emphasize and show emotion behind what they are saying.
