= Alderfer =

Alderfer is a surname. Notable people with the surname include:

- Clayton Alderfer (1940–2015) American psychologist and consultant
- Elizabeth Alderfer (born 1986), American actress
- Gertrude Alderfer (1931–2018), American baseball player
