= Murray's system of needs =

Part of Henry Murray's theory of personality

In 1938, the American psychologist Henry Murray developed a system of needs as part of his theory of personality, which he named personology. Murray argued that everyone had a set of universal basic needs, with individual differences among these needs leading to the uniqueness of personality through varying dispositional tendencies for each need; in other words, a specific need is more important to some people than to others.

In his theory, Murray argues that needs and presses (another component of the theory) acted together to create an internal state of disequilibrium; the individual is then driven to engage in some sort of behavior to reduce the tension. Murray believed that the study of personality should look at the entire person over the course of their lifespan – that people needed to be analysed in terms of complex interactions and whole systems rather than individual parts – and an individual's behaviors, needs and their levels, etc. are all part of that understanding. Murray also argued that there was a biological (specifically, a neurological) basis for personality and behavior.

== Needs ==
Murray defines a need as a drive that has the potential to prompt a behavior from the person. For example, the need for affiliation may drive a person to join a social organization. Needs are often influenced by environmental stimulus or "presses", another component of Murray's theory.

Individual differences in levels of needs lead to the uniqueness of a person's personality; in other words, specific needs may be more important to some people than to others. According to Murray, human needs are psychogenic in origin, function on an unconscious level, and can play a major role in defining personality. Frustration of these psychogenic needs plays a central role in the origin of psychological pain. He also believed that these needs could be measured by projective tests, specifically one he had developed, known as the thematic apperception test (TAT). Unlike Maslow's hierarchy of needs, Murray's needs are not based on a hierarchy; individuals may be high in one and low in the other, and multiple needs may be affected by a single action.

Murray differentiated each need as unique, but recognized commonalities among them, codified at least partially in his categorization system. Behaviors may meet more than one need: for instance, performing a difficult task for your fraternity may meet the needs of both achievement and affiliation. While each need is important in and of itself, he also believed that needs can support or conflict with one another, and can be interrelated. He coined the term "subsidation of needs" to describe when two or more needs are combined in order to satisfy a more powerful need, and the term "fusion of needs" to describe when a single action satisfies more than one need. For example, the need for dominance may conflict the need with affiliation when overly controlling behavior drives away family, romantic partners, and friends. A need may be a purely internal state, but more often it is evoked by a press.

== Presses ==
Murray argued that environmental factors play a role in how psychogenic needs are displayed in behavior. He used the term "presses" to describe external influences on motivation that may influence an individual's level of a need as well as their subsequent behavior. The "press" of an object is what it can do for or to the subject.

Any stimulus with the potential to affect the individual in a positive or negative way is referred to as "pressive", and everything else is referred to as inert. "Pressive Perception" is how the subject interprets a press as either a positive or negative stimulus. "Pressive Apperception" refers to the subjects anticipation that the stimulus will be perceived as either positive or negative. Murray notes that both Pressive Perception and Apperception are largely unconscious. Presses may have positive or negative effects, may be mobile (affecting the subject if they do nothing) or immobile (affecting the subject if they take an action), and may be an alpha press (real effects) or a beta press (merely perceived).

== Needs by category ==
Murray divides needs into several binary categories: manifest (overt) or latent (covert), conscious or unconscious, and primary (viscerogenic) and secondary (psychogenic) needs. Manifest needs are those that are allowed to be directly expressed, while latent needs are not outwardly acted on. Conscious needs as those that a subject can self-report, while unconscious needs are all others. This is distinct from manifest versus latent in that a person may directly express a need they are unaware of, or not express a need they are aware of. The categorization most commonly referred to is the division between primary (viscerogenic) and secondary (psychogenic) needs.

=== Primary/viscerogenic needs ===
Primary needs are defined by Murray as needs involving some biological process and arise in response to certain stimuli or events that drive the body towards a certain outcome ('positive' or 'negative'). For example, dehydration would trigger a "need for water", which in turn drives a person to seek out and intake water. The first six primary needs (air, water, food, sentience, sex, and lactation) are considered "positive" needs, as they drive a person towards a certain object or action. The remaining seven (expiration, urination, defecation, and the four avoidance needs) are considered to be "negative" needs as they drive a person away from an object (or in some cases towards the expulsion of an object).

Primary/viscerogenic needs
Desired Outcome	Need	Directional Force
Intake	Air	Positive Drive towards an object
Intake	Water	Positive Drive towards an object
Intake	Food	Positive Drive towards an object
Intake	Sentience	Positive Drive towards an object
Output	Sex	Positive Drive towards an object
Output	Lactation	Positive Drive towards an object
Output	Expiration (CO_{2})	Negative Drive away from an object
Output	Urination	Negative Drive away from an object
Output	Defecation	Negative Drive away from an object
Retraction	Noxavoidance	Negative Drive away from an object
Retraction	Heatavoidance	Negative Drive away from an object
Retraction	Coldavoidance	Negative Drive away from an object
Retraction	Harmavoidance	Negative Drive away from an object

=== Secondary/psychogenic needs ===
Secondary needs emerge from or are influenced by primary needs. Murray identified 17 secondary needs, each belonging to one of eight need domains: ambition, materialism, status, power, sadomasochism, social-conformance, affection, and information. Needs in each domain have similar themes underpinning them; for instance, the ambition domain contains all those needs which relate to achievement and recognition.

Domain obstructive	Need for...	Representative behavior
Ambition	Superiority	To seek validation for power (often split into Achievement and Recognition)
Ambition	Achievement	To accomplish difficult tasks, overcoming obstacles and becoming expert
Ambition	Recognition	To seek praise and commendation for accomplishments
Ambition	Exhibition	To impress others through one's actions and words, even if these are shocking. (Often combined with Recognition)
Materialism	Acquisition	To gain possession over an object
Materialism	Conservance	To maintain the condition of an object
Materialism	Order	To make things clean, neat and tidy
Materialism	Retention	To keep possession over an object
Materialism	Construction	To organize or build an object or objects
Status	Inviolacy	To prevent harm to self-respect or "good-name"
Status	Infavoidance	To avoid failure and humiliation
Status	Defendance	To defend oneself against attack or blame, hiding any failure of the self.
Status	Counteraction	To make up for failure by trying again, seeking pridefully to overcome obstacles.
Status	Seclusion	To be isolated from others (opposite of Exhibition)
Power	Dominance	To control one's environment or the people in it through command or persuasion
Power	Deference	To admire a superior person; praising them, yielding to them, following their rules.
Power	Autonomy	To resist the influence of others and strive for independence
Power	Contrariance	To act in a unique manner, to be different from the norm
Power	Infavoidance	To avoid being humiliated or embarrassed.
Sadomasochism	Abasement	To surrender and submit to others, accept blame and punishment, to enjoy pain and misfortune
Sadomasochism	Aggression	To forcefully overcome, control, punish, or harm someone
Social-Conformance	Blame avoidance	To inhibit asocial behavior to avoid blame or ostracism
Affection	Affiliation	To be close and loyal to another person, pleasing them and winning their friendship and attention
Affection	Rejection	To separate oneself from a negatively viewed object or person, excluding or abandoning it.
Affection	Nurturance	To help the helpless, feeding them and keeping them from danger
Affection	Succorance	To have one's needs satisfied by someone or something. Includes being loved, nursed, helped, forgiven and consoled
Affection	Play	To have fun, laugh and relax, enjoy oneself
Information	Cognizance	To understand, be curious, ask questions, and acquire new knowledge
Information	Exposition *	To find and demonstrate relations between facts.

== Applications ==
=== Personality testing ===
Murray's system of needs has influenced the creation of personality testing, including both objective and subjective measures. A personality test is a questionnaire or other standardized instrument designed to reveal aspects of an individual's character or psychological makeup. Murray's system of needs directly influenced the development of a variety of personality measures, including the Personality Research Form and the Jackson Personality Inventory.

=== Thematic apperception test ===
Henry Murray, along with Christiana Morgan, developed the thematic apperception test (TAT) as a tool to assess personality. The TAT is based on the assumption that human unconscious needs are directed towards an external stimulus. Murray and Morgan created the TAT to evaluate "press" and "need", which Murray emphasized in his theory of personality. The TAT is administered by an assessor, who chooses a subset of cards (generally concerning a particular theme, or those that they feel best suit the subject) out of the 32 available; Murray recommended selecting 20. Each card features various ambiguous scenes which relate to interpersonal situations. The test-taker is asked to give a detailed explanation of what they see. For example, an explanation may include a narrative of what is happening and what may unfold, and what the characters in the scene are feeling or thinking. From this narrative, the assessor uses Murray's theoretical themes to infer personality characteristics.

=== Further research ===
Murray's theory of personality was the basis for several areas of further psychological research. Three of the needs he identified–the need for power, the need for affiliation, and the need for achievement–were later the subject of substantial study and considered especially significant; used to develop theories such as Maslow's hierarchy of needs, David McClelland's "Achievement Motivation Theory", aspects of Richard Boyatzis' competency-based models of management effectiveness, and more.

Murray's concept of the "press" and his emphasis on the importance of environmental events (and their subjective interpretation) were also highly significant to later psychological research. Behavioral psychology-pioneered by John B. Watson and B. F. Skinner-focused on environmental events, while cognitive psychology included a focus on subjective interpretation of events, based on another one of Murray's ideas (his categorization of presses as either Alpha or Beta).

== Criticisms ==
Although Murray's theory has had a substantial influence on personality testing and research, some critics say that his system of needs is too broad and rather subjective. One criticism of this hierarchy is that it lacks the objective criterion for needs. It can also be said that some of the needs can conflict with each other like achievement and nurturance, which deal with opposing ideas of having to overcome obstacles, with achievement being active and nurturance being passive. This could possibly be due to contrasting instructions from the experimenters.

== See also ==
- Maslow's hierarchy of needs
