= Need for achievement =

Person's desire for significant accomplishment

Need for achievement is a person's desire for significant accomplishment, mastery of skills, control, or high standards. The psychometric device designed to measure need-for-achievement, N-Ach, was popularized by the psychologist David McClelland. A need for achievement figures as a secondary or psychogenic need in Henry Murray's system of needs.

== Theory ==
The pioneering research work of the Harvard Psychological Clinic in the 1930s, summarized in Explorations in Personality, provided the starting point for future studies of personality, especially those relating to needs and motives. David McClelland and his collaborators John William Atkinson, Russell A. Clark and Edgar L. Lowell later investigated achievement motivation and described their work using the term "achievement motivation theory".

== N-Ach measure ==
Using results based on the Thematic Apperception Test, McClelland concluded in a 1958 study that individuals in a society can be grouped into high achievers and low achievers based on their scores on what he called "N-Ach". McClelland also found that high-need-for-achievers will accept risk only to the degree they believe their personal contributions will make a difference in the outcome.

N-Ach is characterized by an enduring and consistent concern with setting and meeting high standards of achievement. This concern is influenced by an internal drive for action (intrinsic motivation), and by the pressure exerted by the expectations of others (extrinsic motivation). Measured with the thematic apperception test (TAT), need for achievement motivates an individual to succeed in competition, and to excel in activities important to them.

N-Ach is related to the difficulty of tasks people choose to undertake. Those with low N-Ach may choose very easy tasks, in order to minimize risk of failure, or highly difficult tasks, such that a failure would not be embarrassing. Those with high N-Ach tend to choose moderately difficult tasks, feeling that they are challenging, but within reach.

McClelland’s research led him to formulate psychological characteristics of people with strong need for achievement. According to McClelland and David Winter (Motivating Economic Achievement), the following features accompany high level of achievement motivation:

- Moderate risk propensity;
- Undertaking innovative and engaging tasks;
- Internal locus of control and responsibility for own decisions and behaviors;
- Need for precise goal setting.

A 1982 study conducted by McClellan and coauthors found that high need for achievement (N-Ach) was linked to success in lower-level management roles, in which promotions were influenced by individual contributions. At higher management levels where promotions were based on demonstrated leadership ability, high N-Ach was not associated with success.

== See also ==
- Emotional security
- Euthyphro dilemma
- Goal orientation
- Identity performance
- Life stance
- Need for affiliation
- Need for cognition
- Need for power
- Need theory
- Self-fulfillment
