= Need for power =

Need for power (nPow) is a term that was popularized by psychologist David McClelland in 1961. McClelland's thinking was influenced by the pioneering work of Henry Murray, who first identified underlying psychological human needs and motivational processes (1938). It was Murray who set out a taxonomy of needs, including needs for achievement, power, and affiliation—and placed these in the context of an integrated motivational model. McClelland was inspired by Murray's research, and he continued to further develop Murray's theory by focusing on this theory in regard to the human population. In McClelland's book The Achieving Society, nPow helps explain an individual's imperative to be in charge. According to his work there are two kinds of power, social and personal.

== Background ==
=== Murray's system of needs ===
Henry Murray was one of the first psychologists to systematically investigate human needs. In his 1938 book, Explorations in Human Personality, he identified and labeled twenty needs he believed were universal in nature for all humans. Later research demonstrated that Murray's system of needs positively correlates with the Big Five personality traits.

=== McClelland's three needs theory ===
In the 1960s, psychologist David McClelland expanded on Murray's work, focusing on the effects of human needs in a work environment. His need theory proposes that most people are consistently motivated by one of three basic desires: the need for affiliation, the need for achievement, or the need for power.

=== Thematic apperception test ===
To determine how strongly an individual felt each of the three needs, McClelland used the thematic apperception test (TAT), which is designed to uncover a person's unconscious drives, emotions, wants and needs. During the test, a psychologist shows an individual a series of picture cards depicting ambiguous situations and asks them to tell a story about each image. The psychologist then interprets those stories to identify desires or personality traits the individual may be unaware of or want to hide. Several empirical studies have demonstrated that the TAT cannot detect mental illness at a rate higher than chance, and the inter-rater validity as measured by Cronbach's alpha (the likelihood of two psychologists providing similar interpretations of the same person's results) is low, especially if the clinician gives a subjective interpretation instead of using the test's original scoring system. However, proponents of the TAT argue that Cronbach's alpha is artificially low for tests with a small number of items, and that the TAT provides a more detailed and flexible description of an individual than a structured questionnaire.

== Effects of a high need for power ==
McClelland defines the need for power (nPow) as a desire for "power either to control other people (for [one's] own goals) or to achieve higher goals (for the greater good)," and describes people high in this trait as seeking "neither recognition nor approval from others - only agreement and compliance.". In his later research, McClelland refined his theory to include two distinct types of power motivation: the need for socialized power, expressed on the TAT by descriptions of plans, self-doubts, mixed outcomes, and concern for others, and the need for personal power, expressed by stories in which one individual seeks power and must oppose another to get it. Compared to people who value affiliation or achievement, individuals with high nPow scores tend to be more argumentative, more assertive in group discussions, and more likely to experience frustration when they feel powerless or not in control of a situation. They are more likely to seek or hold a position in which they have control over others, and to engage in conspicuous consumption.

=== Pros and cons ===
==== For individuals ====
A high nPow score predicts greater career success for men and for women who report high satisfaction with the power-related aspects of their workplace. McClelland's own research included case studies illustrating the advantage of high nPow in the workplace, especially for more experienced workers competing for management positions. In one characteristic example, a successful salesman with a high need for affiliation and a low need for power began to perform poorly after being promoted to management. He experienced difficulty giving direct orders, leading his subordinates to complain that he failed to set clear goals and reward individuals who performed well.

Outside of work, a high nPow score is associated with both positive and negative outcomes, with the result often depending on whether an individual also reports a strong sense of responsibility. When combined with a low score on a measure of responsibility, a high nPow score predicts higher rates of externalizing self-destructive behavior, such as binge-drinking and physical aggression. Men with this combination of personality traits are more likely to divorce, separate, or physically abuse their spouses. However, this association disappears for individuals with average or high responsibility scores, who are disproportionately likely to report positive outcomes like taking on social leadership roles.

==== For society ====
As with individual outcomes, whether a high need for power results in positive or negative outcomes is influenced by the individual's other traits, particularly responsibility and empathy. An argumentative group member may prevent groupthink, or they may intimidate other group members and refuse to make reasonable compromises; a hard-charging manager may motivate and focus their team, or they may bully and manipulate their subordinates. Even dangerous behaviors, like impulsive risk-taking, can be beneficial in moderation: successful stock traders and entrepreneurs often have a high propensity for risk.

=== Gender ===
On average, men report a higher need for power than women, which may be due to biological factors, social factors, or an interaction between them. Gender also influences how the need for power is outwardly expressed: men are more likely to express anger directly, use physical violence to establish control, or engage in risky or impulsive behavior, while women are more likely to employ relational aggression or suppress their hostility. When the needs for socialized and personal power are measured separately, women managers express a greater desire for socialized power than their male counterparts, but an equal desire for personal power. Men, but not women, reported greater job satisfaction if they had a high need for socialized power.

== Other parts of the theory ==
=== Need for achievement ===
Murray defined need for achievement as the attempt to overcome obstacles. Need for achievement (nAch) was defined by McClelland as the motive to strive for success in particular situations in which his/her performance would be looked at against some type of standard. McClelland used the thematic apperception test in order to test this part of his theory. He would show people four pictures and ask people to write a story regarding these pictures. Based on his/her story, McClelland would be able to determine what type of achievement a person strived.

=== Need for affiliation ===
Murray believed need for affiliation was a trait that was very strong in most people, especially in stressful situations. Murray believed that when people were put into a stressful situation, people were more likely to feel less stress if another person was present. In McClelland's research, he found that people who had need for affiliation were often unpopular tried to avoid interpersonal conflicts because they have levels of anxiety about if others will accept them.

== See also ==
- Will to power
