= Need theory =

Theory of human achievement and motivation by David McClelland (1961)

Need theory, also known as three needs theory, is a motivational model and management tool proposed by psychologist David McClelland, which attempts to explain how the needs for achievement, affiliation, and power affect the actions of people. The model was developed in the 1960s, two decades after Maslow's hierarchy of needs was first proposed in the early 1940s. McClelland stated that every person has these three types of motivation regardless of age, sex, race, or culture. The type of motivation by which each individual is driven derives from their life experiences and the opinions of their culture. This need theory is often taught in classes concerning management or organizational behaviour.

== Need for achievement ==
People who have a need for achievement prefer to work on tasks of moderate difficulty in which results are based on their efforts rather than on anything else to receive feedback on their work. Achievement based individuals tend to avoid both high-risk and low-risk situations. Low-risk situations are seen as too easy to be valid and the high-risk situations are seen as based more on the luck of the situation rather than the achievements that individual made. This personality type is motivated by accomplishment in the workplace and an employment hierarchy with promotional positions.

== Need for affiliation ==
People who have a need for affiliation prefer to spend time creating and maintaining social relationships, enjoy being a part of groups, and have a desire to feel loved and accepted. People in this group tend to adhere to the norms of the culture in that workplace and typically do not change the norms of the workplace for fear of rejection. This person favors collaboration over competition and does not like situations with high risk or high uncertainty. People who have a need for affiliation work well in areas based on social interactions like customer service or client interaction positions.

== Need for power ==
People who have a need for power prefer to work and place a high value on discipline. The downside to this motivational type is that group goals can become zero-sum in nature, that is, for one person to win, another must lose. However, this can be positively applied to help accomplish group goals and to help others in the group feel competent about their work. A person motivated by this need enjoys status recognition, winning arguments, competition, and influencing others. With this motivational type comes a need for personal prestige, and a constant need for a better personal status.

== Effect ==
McClelland's research showed that 86% of the population are dominant in one, two, or all three of these three types of motivation. His subsequent research, published in the 1977 Harvard Business Review article "Power is the Great Motivator", found that people in top management positions had a high need for power and a low need for affiliation. His research also found that people with a high need for achievement will do best when given projects where they can succeed through their own efforts. Although individuals with a strong need for achievement can be successful lower-level managers, they are usually weeded out before reaching top management positions. He also found that people with a high need for affiliation may not be good top managers but are generally happier, and can be highly successful, in non-leadership roles such as the foreign service.
