= John William Atkinson =

American psychologist

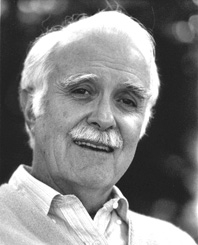
John William Atkinson, 1985

John William Atkinson (December 31, 1923 – October 27, 2003), also known as Jack Atkinson, was an American psychologist who pioneered the scientific study of human motivation, achievement and behavior. He was a World War II veteran, teacher, scholar, and long term member of the University of Michigan community.

Atkinson was a leader in establishing motivation as a distinct field of study in psychology research. His belief that scientific progress came from conceptual breakthroughs fueled his formulation and reformulation of a theory of motivation. He was one of the first in psychology to incorporate rigorous mathematical models in his theories and to use computer simulations of these models for experimentation. He also recognized the importance of measurement in science, maintaining a career-long interest in the refinement of measures of motivation by means of content analysis of imaginative thought using, for example, the Thematic Apperception Test which he developed jointly with David C. McClelland. The scoring system developed by McClelland and Atkinson measures an individual's score for each of the needs of achievement, affiliation and power. This score can be used to suggest the types of jobs for which the person might be well suited.

In 1979, he received the American Psychological Association's highest award, the Gold Medal for Distinguished Scientific Contributions.

== Biography ==
=== Early life ===
Atkinson was born in Jersey City, New Jersey, to Frank G. and Wilhelmina "Minnie" Atkinson. He attended public schools in Oradell, graduating from Dwight Morrow High School in Englewood, New Jersey. He enlisted in the U.S. Army Air Corps, earning his wings in 1944. He served as an advanced instrument flight instructor for Twin Engine Advanced Training, Army Air Force (AAF) at Moody Field, Valdosta, Georgia, including the B-24 and B-25 bomber aircraft.

On earning his wings Jack married his high-school sweetheart Mary Jane Wanta in 1944 in Macon, Georgia.

=== Education ===
After the war Atkinson completed his undergraduate psychology degree with Honors at Wesleyan University, graduating in the middle of the 1946-47 academic year. As a lecturer at Wesleyan University, he began to pursue his interests in basic research on the arousal of human needs and behavior with the financial support of the Office of Naval Research and collaboration with David McClelland. Atkinson was awarded his doctorate in Psychology in 1950 at the University of Michigan. He was invited to join the faculty of the University of Michigan in the Psychology Department where he remained his entire career (1950 - 1985).

=== Career ===
Atkinson was devoted to the teaching of undergraduates throughout his career. As one of the original founders of the University of Michigan's Honors Program in the College of Literature, Science and the Arts, Atkinson fostered unique opportunities and created multi-disciplinary courses to challenge undergraduate students. He authored and edited many books and articles on the scientific study of human motivation, achievement and behavior. Many of his books have been translated into other languages, including Russian, German, and Spanish. His theoretical and experimental work spanned decades and spawned many doctorates.

Atkinson was elected a Fellow of the American Academy of Arts and Sciences in 1979. Other awards and honors include a Guggenheim Fellowship (1960), participation twice as a Fellow at the Center for Advanced Study in the Behavioral Sciences at Stanford University, Fellow of the American Psychological Association, an Honorary Doctorate from Ruhr University, Germany, Wesleyan University Distinguished Alumni Award, the Association for Psychological Science: William James Fellow Award, and the American Psychological Association highest award, the Gold Medal for Distinguished Scientific Contribution. Atkinson was honored on his retirement with a special colloquium at the University which brought together a number of his former students and colleagues who spoke of his inspiration and contributions to the science of human motivation. He was named Professor Emeritus in 1985.

=== Political views ===
Atkinson insisted on ethical behavior and highly valued the fundamental freedoms on which the United States was founded. An expression of his support for a free press was his role as a member of the Board of Control of the Michigan Daily during the turbulent 1960s. In the early 1970s, his beliefs led him to become outraged by the behavior of President Richard M. Nixon, whom he viewed as a threat to liberty and justice. He organized and led public meetings and demonstrations denouncing President Nixon and vigorously promoted Nixon's impeachment by Congress.

== Publications: Books ==
- "Studies in Projective Measurement of Achievement Motivation", By John William Atkinson, University of Michigan Microfilms, 1950.
- The Achievement Motive, By McClelland, D. C., Atkinson, J. W., Clark, R. A., 4 Lowell, E. L., New York: Appleton-Century-Crofts, 1953.
- "Nebraska Symposium on Motivation", By Marshall R. Jones and John William Atkinson, University of Nebraska Press, 1954.
- Motives in Fantasy, Action, and Society: a method of assessment and study, By John W. Atkinson, Van Nostrand (1958) ISBN 0-442-00367-6 ISBN 978-0442003678
- "Achievement Motive and Text Anxiety Conceived as Motive to Approach Success and Motive to Avoid Failure", By John William Atkinson and George H. Litwin, Bobbs-Merrill Company, 1960.
- Effects of ability grouping in schools: Related to individual differences in achievement-related motivation, final report, By John W. Atkinson and Patricia O'Connor, Ann Arbor: University of Michigan, College of Literature, Science, and the Arts, Dept. of Psychology (1963)
- An Introduction to Motivation, By John William Atkinson, D. Van Nostrand Company, Inc (1965), Oxford, England: Van Nostrand; (1964), ISBN 0-442-20367-5
- Human motivation: a symposium, By Marshall R. Jones and John William Atkinson, University of Nebraska Press; 1st Edition (1965)
- The Dynamics of Action, By John William Atkinson and David Birch, New. York: Wiley (1970) ISBN 0-471-03624-2 ISBN 978-0471036241
- A Theory of Achievement Motivation, By John William Atkinson and Norman T. Feather, Volume 6, Wiley, (1966), Krieger Pub Co (June 1, 1974), ISBN 0-88275-166-2
- Motivation and Achievement, By John William Atkinson and Joel O. Raynor, Winston; [distributed by Halsted Press Division, New York] (1974) ISBN 0-470-03626-5, ISBN 978-0-470-03626-6
- Personality, Motivation and Achievement, By John William Atkinson and Joel O. Raynor, Hemisphere Pub. Corp. (1978) ISBN 0-470-99336-7, ISBN 978-0-470-99336-1
- Personality, Motivation, and Action: Selected papers (Centennial psychology series), By John William Atkinson, Praeger (1983), ISBN 0-03-060541-5
- Motivation, Thought, and Action, By Julius Kuhl, and John W. Atkinson, New York: Praeger Publishers (June 6, 1986) ISBN 0-275-92096-8
- "Dictionary of Psychology", By John William Atkinson, Eric Berne, and Robert Sessions Woodworth, 4th Edition, GOYL SaaB, 1988.
