= Need for affiliation =

Person's need to feel sense of involvement and belonging in a social group

The need for affiliation (N-Affil) is a term which describes a person's need to feel a sense of involvement and belongingness within a social group. The term was popularized by David McClelland, whose thinking was strongly influenced by the pioneering work of Henry Murray, who first identified underlying psychological human needs and motivational processes in 1938. It was Murray who set out a classification of needs, including achievement, power and affiliation, and placed these in the context of an integrated motivational model. People with a high need for affiliation require warm interpersonal relationships and approval from those with whom they have regular contact. Having a strong bond with others make a person feel as if they are a part of something important that creates a powerful impact. People who place high emphasis on affiliation tend to be supportive team members, but may be less effective in leadership positions. A person who takes part in a group, whether it be a movement or project, helps create a push towards a sense of achievement and satisfaction for the individual and the whole.

Within group processes, individuals are invariably driven to develop and preserve meaningful social relationships with others. Specifically, people tend to use approval cues to create, maintain, and assess the intimacy of our relationships with other people. First, though, in order to move toward these affiliations, people must abide by social norms which promote liking and reciprocity.

The first major implication of the need to affiliate with others is liking – in which the more we like or accept other people, the more likely we are to attempt to develop close relationships with them. There are a number of ways to accomplish this liking factor, including responding to requests for help, greater perceived similarity with someone else, and impression management through ingratiation. Firstly, responding to requests for help creates a very positive relationship between compliance and fondness for a person. On the other hand, greater perceived similarity between individuals can also lead to fondness and potential friendships. This factor leads to increased compliance, and it can include any similarity from shared names or birthdays, to deeper connections such as a shared career or education. Lastly, impression management through ingratiation is a third means by which people use the liking principle to satisfy their need for affiliation. This is a means to get others to like us through the effects of flattery, which could be something as small as remembering a person’s name, to constant compliments and admiration.

The second major implication of the goal to affiliate with others is the norm of reciprocation – the norm which suggests we must compensate others for what we have accepted from them. This implication builds confidence and fairness in relationships, and it is deeply ingrained in individuals in both public and private settings. The norm of reciprocation is used to explain the effectiveness of multiple psychological processes, such as the door-in-the-face technique. In short, this technique operates by leading the request for a desired action with a more extreme request that will likely get rejected. In terms of reciprocity, the target ultimately feels more compelled to reciprocate this grant with a grant of their own, moving from a place of noncompliance to compliance.

== Definition ==
Affiliation is a positive, sometimes intimate, personal relationship. Affiliation can include "concern over establishing, maintaining, or restoring a positive affective relationship with another person or persons".

== Situations ==
There are many situations in which people feel a need for affiliation. For example, in a business setting, when creating a new product there can be many different ideas on how to market the product. A recently hired employee might feel a need for affiliation to have their idea heard because they feel this is the best course of action. If that person's idea is a success then that individual will feel a sense of achievement. Thus, being new the employee, he decides to involve himself so he feels a sense of belonging to the rest of the employees. One situation that caused great affiliation was the September 11 terrorist attack on the World Trade Center. This event led to Americans' putting their differences aside and coming together. The increase in an individual's need for affiliation allowed individuals responding to the same stressor to come together and find security in one another. Situations that include fear often lead people to want to be together and trigger a need for affiliation. Research done by Schachter (1959) shows that fear that comes from anxiety increases the need for the person to affiliate with others who are going through the same situation or that could help them through the stressful event. The strength of this need changes from one person to the next, there are moments that people just want to be together.

The need for affiliation for an individual can vary over short amounts of time; there are times when individuals wish to be with others and other times to be alone. In one study, completed by Shawn O'Connor and Lorne Rosenblood, beepers were distributed to the students. The students were then asked to record, when their beepers went off, whether or not they wanted to be alone or if they wanted to be with others at that particular moment. This study was done to observe how frequently college students were in the presence of others and how frequently they were alone. The next step in this study asked for the students to record whether, at the time their beeper went off, they wanted to be alone or in the company of others. This response that they gave usually reflected which of the two situations they were experiencing the next time their beepers went off. The information retained from this study helped to show the strength of an individual's need for affiliation. By showing how frequently they obtained the presence of others when they felt that it was what they wanted at that moment it showed how strong their need for affiliation was at that particular moment.

Depending on the specific circumstances, an individual's level of need for affiliation can become increased or decreased. Yacov Rofe suggested that the need for affiliation depended on whether being with others would be useful for the situation or not. When the presence of other people was seen as being helpful in relieving an individual from some of the negative aspects of the stressor, an individual's desire to affiliate increases. However, if being with others may increase the negative aspects such as adding the possibility of embarrassment to the already present stressor, the individual's desire to affiliate with others decreases. Individuals are often motivated to find and create a specific amount of social interactions. Each individual desires a different amount of a need for affiliation and they desire an optimal balance of time to their self and time spent with others.

== See also ==
- Affection
- Need theory
- Need for achievement
- Murray's system of needs
- Maslow's hierarchy of needs
- Cultural identity
- Imagined community
