= Need =

Thing that is necessary for an organism to live a healthy life

A need is a requirement for survival or optimal functioning at a point of time and in a given context. Needs are distinguished from wants. In the case of a need, a deficiency causes a clear adverse outcome: a dysfunction or death. In other words, a need is something required for a safe, stable and healthy life (e.g. air, water, food, land, shelter) while a want is a desire, wish or aspiration. When needs or wants are backed by purchasing power, they have the potential to become economic demands.

Basic needs such as air, water, food and protection from environmental dangers are necessary for an organism to live. In addition to basic needs, humans also have needs of a social or societal nature such as the human need for purpose, to socialize, to belong to a family or community or other group. Needs can be objective and physical, such as the need for food, or psychical and subjective, such as the need for self-esteem. Understanding both kinds of "unmet needs" is improved by considering the social context of their not being fulfilled.

Needs and wants are a matter of interest in, and form a common substrate for, the fields of philosophy, biology, psychology, social science, economics, marketing and politics, and for a number of helping and health professions, including social work.

== Psychological definition ==
To most psychologists, need is a psychological feature that arouses an organism to action toward a goal, giving purpose and direction to behavior.

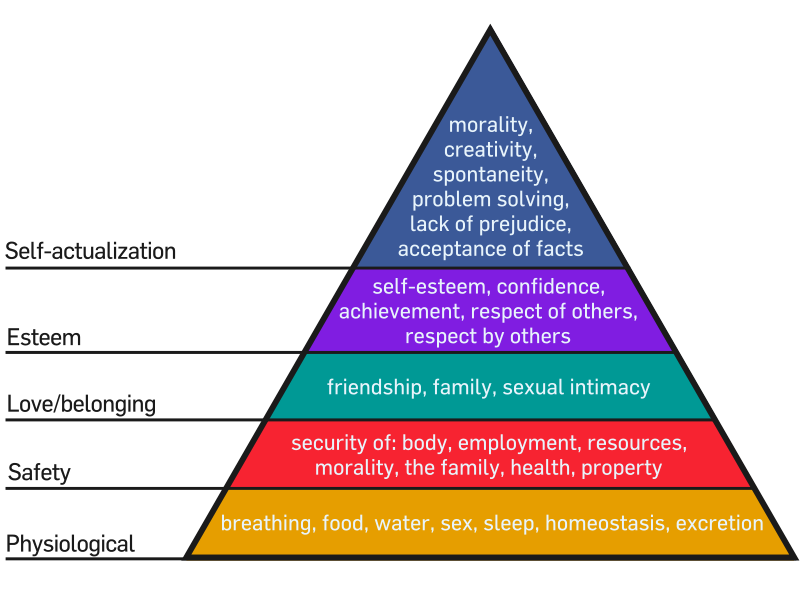
Maslow's Hierarchy of Needs

The most widely known academic model of needs was proposed by psychologist Abraham Maslow in his hierarchy of needs in 1943. His theory proposed that people have a hierarchy of psychological needs, which range from basic physiological or lower order needs such as food, water and safety (e.g. shelter) through to the higher order needs such as self-actualization. People tend to spend most of their resources (time, energy and finances) attempting to satisfy these basic before the higher order needs of belonging, esteem and self-actualization become meaningful. Maslow's approach is a generalised model for understanding human motivations in a wide variety of contexts but must be adapted for specific contexts. While intuitively appealing, Maslow's model has been difficult to operationalize experimentally. It was developed further by Clayton Alderfer.

The academic study of needs, which was at its zenith in the 1950s. One exception involves Richard Sennett's work on the importance of respect.

One difficulty with a psychological theory of needs is that conceptions of "need" may vary radically among different cultures or among different parts of the same society. For a psychological theory of human need, one found compatible with the Doyal/Gough Theory, see Self-Determination Theory (SDT).

Self-determination theory (SDT) has been the subject of a full-length volume by the late Edward L. Deci and Richard M. Ryan, who summarized the progress of theory, research and application of SDT in Self-Determination Theory: Basic Psychological Needs in Motivation, Development, and Wellness (Deci & Ryan, 2017).

== Doyal and Gough's definition ==
A second view of need is presented in the work of political economy professor Ian Gough, who has published on the subject of human needs in the context of social assistance provided by the welfare state. Together with medical ethics professor Len Doyal, he published A Theory of Human Need in 1991.

Their view goes beyond the emphasis on psychology: it might be said that an individual's needs represent "the costs of being human" within society. A person who does not have their needs fulfilled—i.e., a "needy" person—will function poorly in society.

In the view of A Theory of Human Need (THN) of Gough and Doyal, every person has an objective interest in avoiding serious harm that prevents that person from endeavoring to attain their vision of what is good, regardless of what exactly that may be. That endeavour requires a capacity to participate in the societal setting in which the individual lives. More specifically, every person needs to possess both physical health and personal autonomy. The latter involves the capacity to make informed choices about what should be done and how to implement it. This requires mental health, cognitive skills, and opportunities to participate in society's activities and collective decision-making.

How are such needs satisfied? Doyal and Gough point to twelve broad categories of "intermediate needs" that define how the needs for physical health and personal autonomy are fulfilled:

1. Adequate nutritious food and water
2. Adequate protective housing
3. A safe work environment
4. A supply of clothing
5. A safe physical environment
6. Appropriate health care
7. Security in childhood
8. Meaningful primary relations with others
9. Physical security
10. Economic security
11. Safe birth control and child-bearing
12. Appropriate basic and cross-cultural education

How are the details of needs satisfaction determined? The authors point to rational identification of needs, using up-to-date scientific knowledge; consideration of the actual experiences of individuals in their everyday lives; and democratic decision-making. The satisfaction of human needs cannot be imposed "from above".

This theory may be compared to the capability approach developed by Amartya Sen and Martha Nussbaum. Individuals with more internal "assets" or "capacities" (e.g., education, mental health, physical strength, etc.) have more capabilities (i.e., more available choices, more positive freedom). They are thus more able to escape or avoid poverty. Those individuals who possess more capabilities fulfill more of their needs.

Pending publication in 2015 in the Cambridge Journal of Economics of the final version of this work, Gough discussed the Doyal/Gough theory in a working paper available online.

For links to the published version of the Cambridge Journal of Economics article and subsequent work by Ian Gough, see https://www.iangough.com/.

== Other views ==
The concept of intellectual need has been studied in education, as well as in social work, where an Oxford Bibliographies Online: Social Work entry on Human Need reviewed the literature as of 2008 on human need from a variety of disciplines. Also see the 2008 and pending 2015 entries on Human Needs: Overview in the Encyclopedia of Social Work.

In his 1844 Paris Manuscripts, Karl Marx famously defined humans as "creatures of need" or "needy creatures" who experienced suffering in the process of learning and working to meet their needs. These needs were both physical needs as well as moral, emotional and intellectual needs. According to Marx, human development is characterized by the fact that in the process of meeting their needs, humans develop new needs, implying that at least to some extent they make and remake their own nature. This idea is discussed in more detail by the Hungarian philosopher Ágnes Heller in A Theory of Need in Marx (London: Allison and Busby, 1976). Political economy professor Michael Lebowitz has developed the Marxian interpretation of needs further in two editions of his book Beyond Capital.

Professor György Márkus systematised Marx's ideas about needs as follows: humans are different from other animals because their vital activity, work, is mediated to the satisfaction of needs (an animal who manufactures tools to produce other tools or his/her satisfactory), which makes a human being a universal natural being capable to turn the whole nature into the subject of his/her needs and his/her activity, and develops his/her needs and abilities (essential human forces) and develops himself/herself, a historical-universal being. Work generates the breach of the animal subject-object fusion, thus generating the possibility of human conscience and self-conscience, which tend to universality (the universal conscious being). A human being's conditions as a social being are given by work, but not only by work as it is not possible to live like a human being without a relationship with others: work is social because human beings work for each other with means and abilities produced by prior generations. Human beings are also free entities able to accomplish, during their lifetime, the objective possibilities generated by social evolution, on the basis of their conscious decisions. Freedom should be understood both in a negative (freedom to decide and to establish relationships) and a positive sense (dominion over natural forces and development of human creativity) of the essential human forces. To sum up, the essential interrelated traits of human beings are: a) work is their vital activity; b) human beings are conscious beings; c) human beings are social beings; d) human beings tend to universality, which manifests in the three previous traits and make human beings natural-historical-universal, social-universal and universal conscious entities, and e) human beings are free.

In his texts about what he calls "moral economics", professor Julio Boltvinik Kalinka asserts that the ideas exposed by David Wiggins about needs are correct but insufficient: needs are of a normative nature but they are also factual. These "gross ethical concepts" (as stated by Hilary Putnam) should also include an evaluation: Ross Fitzgerald's criticism of Maslow's ideas rejects the concept of objective human needs and uses instead the concept of preferences.

Marshall Rosenberg's model of Compassionate Communication, also known as Nonviolent Communication (NVC) makes the distinction between universal human needs (what sustains and motivates human life) and specific strategies used to meet these needs. Feelings are seen as neither good nor bad, right nor wrong, but as indicators of when human needs are met or unmet. In contrast to Maslow, Rosenberg's model does not place needs in a hierarchy.

Rosenberg's model supports people developing awareness of feelings as indicators, of what needs are alive within them and others, moment by moment; to forefront needs, to make it more likely and possible for two or more people, to arrive at mutually agreed upon strategies to meet the needs of all parties. Rosenberg diagrams this sequence in part like this: Observations > Feelings > Needs > Requests where identifying needs is most significant to the process.

People also talk about the needs of a community or organisation. Such needs might include demand for a particular type of business, for a certain government program or entity, or for individuals with particular skills. This is an example of metonymy in language and presents with the logical problem of reification.

Medical needs. In clinical medical practice, it may be difficult to distinguish between treatment a patient needs; treatment that may be desirable;and treatment that could be deemed frivolous. At one end of this spectrum for example, any practising clinician would accept that a child with fulminating meningococcal meningitis needs rapid access to medical care. At the other end, rarely could a young healthy woman be deemed to need breast augmentation. Numerous surgical procedures fall into this spectrum: particularly, this is so in our ageing Western population, where there is an ever-increasing prevalence of painful, but not life-threatening disorders: typified by the ageing spine.

== See also ==
- Consumer behaviour
- Human rights
- Homeostasis
- Information needs
- Maslow's hierarchy of needs
- Mental health
- Murray's system of needs
- Needs assessment
- Need theory (McClelland)
- Nonviolent Communication
- Poverty
- Simple living
- Want
- Well-being
