= Insecurity (emotion) =

Feeling of inadequacy

Insecurity is the emotion associated with a lack of confidence within oneself. It is often associated with feelings of fear and uncertainty, especially surrounding one's abilities. The word was originally used in the psychological sense in the year 1917. It has been observed in both adults and children. The word is also associated with attachment styles.

== Characteristics ==
Abraham Maslow described an insecure person as a person who "perceives the world as a threatening jungle and most human beings as dangerous and selfish; feels like a rejected and isolated person, anxious and hostile; is generally pessimistic and unhappy; shows signs of tension and conflict, tends to turn inward; is troubled by guilt-feelings, has one or another disturbance of self-esteem; tends to be neurotic; and is generally selfish and egocentric." He viewed in every insecure person a continual, never dying, longing for security.

A person's capacity for deep thought, understanding others' perspectives, and awareness of their own mortality can contribute to feelings of insecurity. One hypothesis proposes that children's responses to marital conflict are driven by their need for emotional security, which influences their emotional regulation and behavior. This theory suggests that children's past experiences with marital conflict shape their emotional security, which in turn affects their long-term adjustment and future responses to family dynamics, including parent-child relationships.

Feelings of insecurity can arise due to feelings of inadequacy in any domain, whether it may be in a relationship or workplace setting.

== See also ==
- Anxiety
- Cowardice
- Social vulnerability
