= David McClelland =

American psychologist (1917–1998)

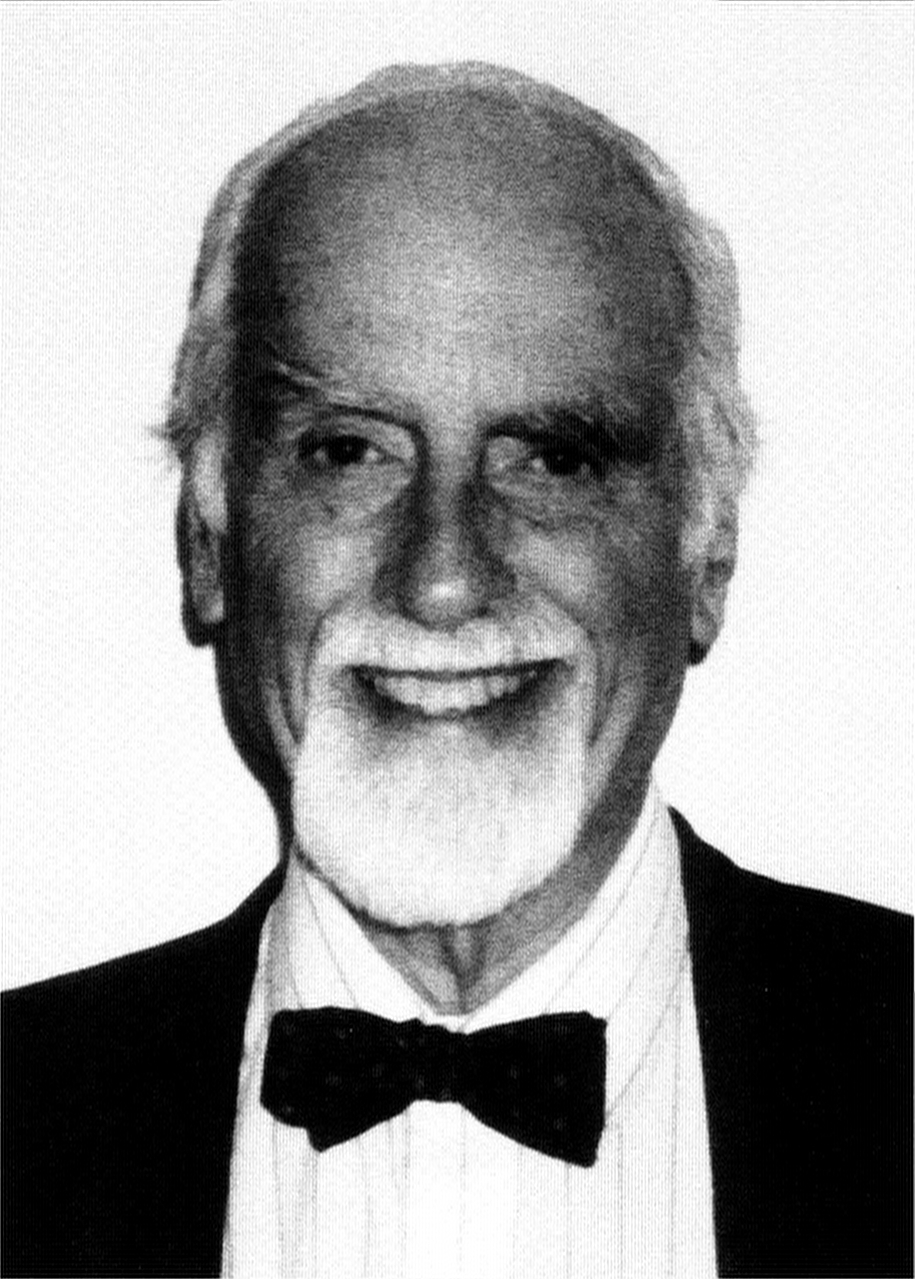
- Born: David Clarence McClelland; May 20, 1917; Mt. Vernon, New York, U.S.
- Died: March 27, 1998 (aged 80)
- Education: Wesleyan University; University of Missouri; Yale University
- Known for: Need theory

David Clarence McClelland (May 20, 1917 – March 27, 1998) was an American psychologist, noted for his work on motivation need theory. He published a number of works between the 1950s and the 1990s and developed new scoring systems for the Thematic Apperception Test (TAT) and its descendants. McClelland is credited with developing Achievement Motivation Theory, commonly referred to as "need for achievement" or n-achievement theory. A Review of General Psychology survey published in 2002, ranked McClelland as the 15th most cited psychologist of the 20th century.

== Life and career ==
McClelland, born in Mt. Vernon, New York, was awarded a Bachelor of Arts from Wesleyan University in 1938, an MA from the University of Missouri in 1939, and a PhD in experimental psychology from Yale University in 1941. He taught at Connecticut College and Wesleyan University before joining the faculty at Harvard University in 1956, where he worked for 30 years, serving as chairman of the Department of Psychology and Social Relations. In 1987, he moved to Boston University, where he was awarded the American Psychological Association Award for Distinguished Scientific Contributions. He was a devoted Quaker.

The major themes of David McClelland's work were on personality and the application of that knowledge to helping people make their lives better. One theme was the development of the expectancy-value theory of human motivation. A second theme was the development of tests and operant methods, such as the Thematic Apperception Test, Behavioral Event Interview, and the Test of Thematic Analysis. A third theme was the development of job-competency studies, and a fourth theme was the application of this research to helping people and their social systems, whether that was through motivation and competency development, organization and community development, and changing behavior to battle stress and addiction. David McClelland believed in applying the results from the research and testing to see if they helped people. He was instrumental in starting 14 research and consulting companies, the largest was McBer and Company (1965-1989), which later was sold to Yankelovich, Skelly & White.

=== Expectancy value theory of motivation ===
McClelland claimed that motivation is "a recurrent concern for a goal state or condition as measured in fantasy, which drives, directs and selects the behavior of the individual". Basing his work on the work of Henry Murray, he focused on three particular motives: the need for achievement (N-Ach); the need for affiliation (N-Aff); and the need for power (N-Pow). N-Ach is the desire to excel in relation to a set of standards. It is the drive to succeed. N-Pow is the desire to be influential and affect an organization. N-Aff is the desire for close personal relationships. McClelland's three needs, are non-sequential, but instead are used in relation to each other.

"According to his theory, most people possess and portray a mixture of these needs: those with a high need for achievement have an attraction to situations offering personal accountability; individuals with a dominating need for authority and power have a desire to influence and to increase personal status and prestige; and finally, those with a great need for affiliation value building strong relationships and belonging to groups or organizations."

The work in the 1940s through the late 1960s focused on the Achievement Motive and its impact on development of economies and entrepreneurship. He shifted his work in the 1960s to focus on the power motive, first addressing issues of addiction and alcoholism (McClelland, Davis, Kalin and Wanner, 1972), then to leadership effectiveness, and later to community development. The work on leadership and management helped to create a behavioral level of a person's capability, which McClelland called "competencies.' He also led efforts to show how important competencies were relative to knowledge and traditional personality traits in the desired outcomes of higher education (Winter, McClelland and Stewart, 1981). His work on power extended into research on the body's natural healing process.

In an exception from the typical focus of a psychologist, McClelland also examined cultural and country-wide effects of motives and related them to large-scale trends in society, such as economic development, job creation, the provocation of wars and health. McClelland's work on motivation was cited as the most useful approach to motivation in a study by the former accounting firm Touche Ross & Company (Miller, 1981).

=== In search of operant tests and measures ===
David McClelland argued that operant methods (i.e., tests where a person must generate thoughts or actions) were much more valid predictors of behavioral outcomes, job performance, life satisfaction and other similar outcomes. Specifically, he claimed that operant methods had greater validity and sensitivity than respondent measures (i.e., tests calling for a true/false, rating or ranking response). He fought against more traditional psychologists insisting on using self-assessment, respondent measures and avoiding operant measures because, in traditional views, operant measures suffered from less traditional measures of reliability. McClelland believed that better operant measures were possible with the use of reliable codes for processing the information in them. He claimed his lifelong quest was to instill in psychological researchers a value of extracting people's actual thought (i.e., conscious and unconscious) along with their behavior. He was repeatedly publishing research and encouraging his doctoral students and colleagues to show that operant methods, as compared to respondent methods, consistently show: (a) more criterion validity; (b) increased insightfulness despite less test-retest reliability; (c) greater sensitivity in discriminating mood and such differences; (d) more uniqueness and less likelihood of suffering from multicollinearity; (e) greater cross-cultural validity, because they did not require a person to respond to prepared items; and (f) increased utility in applications to human or organizational development.

=== Job competencies ===
McClelland and colleagues conceptualized a broad array of capabilities. Reviving his 1951 personality theory, McClelland and his colleagues at McBer and Company intensified competency research on management, leadership and professional jobs in the early 1970s (i.e., skills, self-image, traits, and motives, see Boyatzis, 1982; Spencer and Spencer, 1993; Goleman, 1998). The definition of a job competency required that the person's intent is understood, not merely that the person's behavior is observed. They used operant methods like audiotaped Critical Incident Interviews, which they called Behavioral event Interviews and videotaped simulations with inductive research designs comparing effective with ineffective or even less effective performers. This approach was focused on the "person," rather than the tasks or job.

The research results developed a picture of how a superior performer in a job thinks, feels, and acts in his/her work setting. This became a model for how to help anyone in a job, or aspiring to one, develop their capability. It became, over the coming decades, the norm for training design, selection and promotion practices, career development and even higher education in developing people for such jobs.

=== Helping People Change ===
David McClelland believed that if you know how an outstanding performer thinks and acts, you could teach people how to think and act that way. The early projects addressed entrepreneurial development and training in achievement thinking and behavior for small business owners in India, Tunisia, Iran, Poland, Malawi and the US.

"Understanding human motivation ought to be a good thing. It should help us to find out what we really want so that we can avoid chasing rainbows that are not for us. It should open up opportunities for self-development if we apply motivational principles to pursuing our goals in life".

== Publications ==
- McClelland, D.C. (1951). Personality. New York: William Sloane Associates.
- McClelland, D.C., Atkinson, J.W., Clark, R.A., and Lowell, E.L. (1953). The Achievement Motive. New York: Appleton-Century-Crofts.
- McClelland, D.C., Baldwin, A.L., Bronfenbrenner, and Strodbeck, F.L. (1958). Talent and Society. New York: Van Nostrand.
- McClelland, D.C. (1961). The Achieving Society. New York: Van Nostrand.
- McClelland, D.C. (1964). The Roots of Consciousness. New York: Van Nostrand.
- McClelland, D.C. and Winter, D.G. (1969). Motivating Economic Achievement. New York: Free Press.
- McClelland, D.C., Davis, W.N., Kalin, R., and Wanner, E. (1972). The Drinking Man: Alcohol and Human Motivation. New York: Free Press.
- McClelland, D.C. (1975). Power: The Inner Experience. New York: Irvington Publishers, Halstead Press.
- Winter, D.G., McClelland, D.G., and Stewart, A.J. (1981). A New Case for the Liberal Arts: Assessing Institutional Goals and Student Development. San Francisco: Jossey-Bass.
- McClelland, D.C. (1984). Motives, Personality, and Society: Selected Papers. New York: Praeger.
- McClelland, D.C. (1987). Human motivation. New York: University of Cambridge.
- Smith, C.P., with Atkinson, J.W., McClelland, D.C., and Veroff, J. (eds.) (1992). Motivation and Personality: Handbook of Thematic Content Analysis. New York: Cambridge University Press.
