= Clayton Alderfer =

American psychologist

Alderfer's ERG Theory

Clayton Paul Alderfer (September 1, 1940 - October 30, 2015) was an American psychologist and consultant known for developing Abraham Maslow's hierarchy of needs into a framework of three essential categories: existence, relatedness, and growth.

== Biography ==
Born in Sellersville, Pennsylvania, Alderfer obtained his BA in psychology in 1962 at Yale University, where he also obtained his PhD in psychology 1966. In 1977 he also obtained certification from the American Board of Professional Psychology (ABPP).

After graduation, Alderfer started his academic career at Cornell University in 1966. In 1968 he returned to Yale University, where he was researcher, lecturer and program director in the Department of Administrative Sciences until 1992. In 1992 he moved to Rutgers University, where he acted as the program director for the Organizational Psychology department at the Graduate School of Applied and Professional Psychology for 12 years. In the new millennium he started his own consultancy firm.

== Work ==
Alderfer developed Maslow's hierarchy of needs into a framework consisting of three essential categories: existence, relatedness, and growth (ERG theory).

== Selected publications ==
- Alderfer, Clayton P., An Empirical Test of a New Theory of Human Needs; Organizational Behaviour and Human Performance, volume 4, issue 2, pp. 142–175, May 1969
- Alderfer, C. P., Existence, Relatedness, and Growth; Human Needs in Organizational Settings, New York: Free Press, 1972
- Alderfer, C. P., "A critique of Salancik and Pfeffer's examination of need-satisfaction theories, Administrative Science Quarterly, 22 (1977), 658-669
- Alderfer, C. P., The Methodology of Organizational Diagnosis, Professional Psychology, 1980, 11, 459–468.
- Alderfer, C. P., An Intergroup Perspective on Group Dynamics. In J. W. Lorsch (editor), Handbook of Organizational Behavior, 1987, 190–222.
- Alderfer, C. P., Consulting to Underbounded Systems, C. P. Alderfer and C. L. Cooper (editors), Advances in Experiential Social Processes, 1980, 2, 267–295.
- Alderfer, C. P., Improving organizational communication through long-term intergroup intervention, Journal of Applied Behavioral Science, 1977, 13, 193–210.
- Alderfer, C. P. and Brown, L. D., Learning from changing, 47–56,129-141.
- Alderfer, C.P. (2005), The Five Laws of Group and Intergroup Dynamics.
