= List of Guggenheim Fellowships awarded in 1989 =

One hundred and ninety-eight scholars, artists, and scientists received Guggenheim Fellowships in 1989. $5,251,000 was disbursed between the recipients, who were chosen from an applicant pool of 3,144. Princeton University had the most fellowship recipients on its faculty (10), followed by University of California, Berkeley (7) in second and Cornell University and Columbia University tied for third (6 each).

== 1989 United States and Canada Fellows ==
Category	Field of Study	Fellow	Institutional association	Research topic	Notes	Ref
Creative Arts	Choreography	Elizabeth Streb	Ringside Inc.	Choreography		
Creative Arts	Drama & Performance Art	John Kelly		Performance art and HIV treatment		
Creative Arts	Drama & Performance Art	Julie Taymor				
Creative Arts	Fiction	Robert Boswell	Warren Wilson College	Writing		
Creative Arts	Fiction	David H. Bradley	Temple University	"New historical novel tracing the history of a Pottsville family from the late 19th century to the 1970s"		
Creative Arts	Fiction	Clyde Edgerton	St. Andrews Presbyterian College	Killer Diller (published 1991)		
Creative Arts	Fiction	David Leavitt		A Place I've Never Been (published 1990)		
Creative Arts	Fiction	Sue Miller		Writing		
Creative Arts	Fiction	Robert Olmstead	Dickinson College (in residence)	Writing		
Creative Arts	Fiction	Carolyn See	Los Angeles Times and UCLA	Making History (published 1991)		
Creative Arts	Fiction	Stephen W. Wright	Princeton University	Writing		
Creative Arts	Film	Su Friedrich		Filmmaking		
Creative Arts	Film	Peter B. Hutton	Bard College	Filmmaking		
Creative Arts	Film	Jon Jost		Filmmaking		
Creative Arts	Film	Errol Morris		Resuming Dr. Death, a documentary about James Grigson, which he started filming in 1985		
Creative Arts	Fine Arts	Rodney Carswell	University of Illinois	Painting		
Creative Arts	Fine Arts	James O. Clark		Sculpture		
Creative Arts	Fine Arts	Petah Coyne		Sculpture		
Creative Arts	Fine Arts	Ann K. Hamilton	UC Santa Barbara	Sculpture		
Creative Arts	Fine Arts	James A. Herbert	University of Georgia	Painting: large canvases	Also won in 1971 (film)	
Creative Arts	Fine Arts	Gerald Kim Jones		Visual and performance art		
Creative Arts	Fine Arts	Max Miller		Painting		
Creative Arts	Fine Arts	Graham Nickson	New York Studio School	Painting		
Creative Arts	Fine Arts	Michael Phillips	College of Charleston	Painting		
Creative Arts	Fine Arts	Adrian Piper	UC San Diego	Conceptual art		
Creative Arts	Fine Arts	Richard Rezac	School of the Art Institute of Chicago	Sculpture: Travel and study in Japan		
Creative Arts	Fine Arts	Alison Saar		Sculpture		
Creative Arts	Fine Arts	Wade H. Saunders	Rhode Island School of Design	Visual art		
Creative Arts	Fine Arts	Peter T. Shelton		Sculpture		
Creative Arts	Fine Arts	Pamela Avril Tucker		Painting		
Creative Arts	Music Composition	Richard Danielpour		Composing		
Creative Arts	Music Composition	James Dashow		Composing		
Creative Arts	Music Composition	Juliana Hall		Composing		
Creative Arts	Music Composition	David Murray		Big band composition		
Creative Arts	Music Composition	Wayne T. Peterson	San Francisco State University	Composing		
Creative Arts	Music Composition	David Rakowski	Stanford University	Composing		
Creative Arts	Music Composition	Augusta Read Thomas		Composing at Royal Academy of London		
Creative Arts	Photography	Dianne Blell		Elephant conservation work in Africa		
Creative Arts	Photography	Jo Ann Callis	California Institute of the Arts			
Creative Arts	Photography	Gregory Conniff		Oxford, Mississippi		
Creative Arts	Photography	Bruce Cratsley				
Creative Arts	Photography	Geoffrey James		Italian gardens		
Creative Arts	Photography	Stuart Klipper			Also won in 1979	
Creative Arts	Photography	Jean N. Locey	Cornell University			
Creative Arts	Poetry	Jonathan W. Galassi	Farrar, Straus and Giroux	Writing		
Creative Arts	Poetry	Laura L. Jensen		Writing		
Creative Arts	Poetry	August Kleinzahler		Writing		
Creative Arts	Poetry	Li-Young Lee		Research in China and Indonesia for a book of autobiographical prose		
Creative Arts	Poetry	David C. Lehman		Writing		
Creative Arts	Poetry	Heather McHugh	Warren Wilson College	Writing		
Creative Arts	Poetry	Michael Palmer		Writing		
Creative Arts	Poetry	Franz Wright	Emerson College	Writing		
Creative Arts	Video & Audio	Cecelia Condit	University of Wisconsin-Madison			
Creative Arts	Video & Audio	Shalom Gorewitz	Ramapo College	Videotaping landscapes that symbolically relate to the theme of invasion and survival, such as Masada and Black Mesa		
Creative Arts	Video & Audio	DeeDee Halleck	Deep Dish Television and Paper Tiger Television	Ecological series		
Creative Arts	Video & Audio	Joan Logue				
Humanities	African Studies	Kenneth F. Kiple	Bowling Green State University	The African Exchange: Biological Consequences of the Atlantic Slave Trade		
Humanities	African Studies	Carmel Schrire	Rutgers University	Impact of colonialism in South Africa		
Humanities	American Literature	Milton J. Bates	University of Memphis	Social and cultural study of Vietnam War literature		
Humanities	American Literature	Donald E. Pease	Dartmouth University	Reconstructing the American civil imagination		
Humanities	American Literature	Kenneth Silverman	New York University			
Humanities	Architecture, Planning, & Design	Malcolm Bell	University of Virginia	Agora of Morgantina		
Humanities	Architecture, Planning, & Design	Clare Cooper Marcus	UC Berkeley	Architecture and a sense of community		
Humanities	Architecture, Planning, & Design	Jerold S. Kayden	Lincoln Institute of Land Policy			
Humanities	Architecture, Planning, & Design	Julia Meech		Frank Lloyd Wright and Japan		
Humanities	Bibliography	Trevor Howard-Hill	University of South Carolina	Editing English drama		
Humanities	Biography	Megan Marshall		The Peabody sisters		
Humanities	Biography	Robert G. O'Meally	Barnard College (visiting)	Johnny Hodges		
Humanities	Biography	Robert D. Richardson Jr.				
Humanities	British History	Judith M. Bennett	University of North Carolina	Brewing industry in 13th- to 18th-century England		
Humanities	British History	Emmet Larkin	University of Chicago			
Humanities	British History	Harold J. Perkin	Northwestern University	Research in Europe, Russia, and Japan		
Humanities	Classics	Roger S. Bagnall	Columbia University	Social history of later Roman Egypt		
Humanities	Classics	Erich S. Gruen	UC Berkeley	Culture and public life in the middle years of the Roman republic	Also won in 1969	
Humanities	Classics	James J. O'Donnell	University of Pennsylvania	Commentary on Confessions of St. Augustine		
Humanities	East Asian Studies	Evelyn Sakakida Rawski	University of Pittsburgh	Social history of the Qing imperial family		
Humanities	East Asian Studies	Vera Schwarcz	Wesleyan University	Comparative study of Chinese and Jewish historical memory		
Humanities	Economic History	John A. James	University of Virginia	Structural change and economic instability in 19th-century America		
Humanities	Economic History	Joseph L. Love	University of Illinois at Urbana-Champaign	How the problem of underdevelopment was understood and theorized by economists and other social scientists in Brazil and Romania in the 20th century		
Humanities	English Literature	Margaret W. Ferguson	Columbia University	Female literacy and literary production in Renaissance France and England		
Humanities	English Literature	Jerrold Edwin Hogle	University of Arizona	Forms of repression in British Gothic fiction and Renaissance drama		
Humanities	English Literature	Victoria Kahn	Princeton University	Conflict and consensus in Renaissance humanism		
Humanities	English Literature	Jon Klancher	Boston University			
Humanities	English Literature	Karen Lawrence	University of Utah	Examination of literature in which the plot of adventure is rewritten with a female protagonist		
Humanities	English Literature	David Marshall	Yale University	Preoccupation with the power of language in 18th-century English literature and culture		
Humanities	English Literature	Karen Newman	Brown University	Women in comedy in early modern England		
Humanities	English Literature	Harriet Ritvo	Massachusetts Institute of Technology			
Humanities	English Literature	Norman Sherry	Trinity University			
Humanities	English Literature	Everett Zimmerman	UC Santa Barbara	English fiction and historiography in the 18th century		
Humanities	Film, Video, & Radio Studies	James L. Hoberman	The Village Voice	American politics portrayed in American movies		
Humanities	Fine Arts Research	Patricia Fortini Brown	Princeton University	Archaeology and art in the Italian Renaissance		
Humanities	Fine Arts Research	David Freedberg	Columbia University	G. B. Ferrari and the relations between art, science, and ethnography in Baroque Rome		
Humanities	Fine Arts Research	Patricia Leighten	University of Delaware	Art and social radicalism in France, 1900-1914		
Humanities	Fine Arts Research	David M. Lubin	Colby College	Art and social change in 19th-century America		
Humanities	Fine Arts Research	Michael Marrinan	Columbia University	Antoine-Jean Gros and the death of history painting		
Humanities	Fine Arts Research	Barbara M. Stafford	University of Chicago	Imaging of the unseen in Enlightenment art and medicine		
Humanities	Folklore & Popular Culture	Richard Bauman	Indiana University	Production and performance in Mexican festival drama		
Humanities	Folklore & Popular Culture	Eli Leon		African American tradition in American quiltmaking		
Humanities	Folklore & Popular Culture	Amy E. Shuman	Ohio State University			
Humanities	French History	Thomas A. Kselman	University of Notre Dame	Views of death and afterlife in 19th-century France		
Humanities	French Literature	Thomas M. Kavanagh	University of Michigan	French Enlightenment attitudes toward chance		
Humanities	French Literature	Nancy K. Miller	Lehman College and CUNY Graduate Center	Gender and the rise of the novel in 18th-century France		
Humanities	General Nonfiction	Nelson Wilmarth Aldrich Jr.		The images and self-images of intoxicated people		
Humanities	General Nonfiction	Anatole Broyard		Memoir of his time living in Greenwich Village		
Humanities	General Nonfiction	David G. Campbell	Grinnell College			
Humanities	General Nonfiction	Lincoln Caplan		Skadden: Power, Money, and the Rise of a Legal Empire (published 1993)		
Humanities	General Nonfiction	Robert Michael Pyle		Effect of the Bigfoot myth on Pacific Northwest culture		
Humanities	General Nonfiction	Orville H. Schell		The Beijing writer Wu Zuguang and actress Xin Fengxia		
Humanities	German & East European History	Tony Judt	New York University			
Humanities	German & East European History	Zara Steiner	University of Cambridge			
Humanities	German & Scandinavian Literature	Anton Kaes	UC Berkeley	Cultural poetics of the Weimar Republic		
Humanities	History of Science & Technology	Theodore M. Porter	University of Virginia	Social and political uses of numbers in modern Europe and America		
Humanities	History of Science & Technology	Charles E. Rosenberg	University of Pennsylvania	Changing views of disease, 1800-present	Also won in 1965	
Humanities	Iberian & Latin American History	Peggy Liss		Biography of Isabel of Castile		
Humanities	Iberian & Latin American History	David Rock	UC Santa Barbara	Argentina		
Humanities	Intellectual & Cultural History	Jean-Christophe Agnew	Yale University	Assessment of cultural history as a field		
Humanities	Intellectual & Cultural History	Isadore Twersky	Harvard University	Relationship between Jewish law and various meta-legal systems		
Humanities	Italian Literature	Millicent Joy Marcus	University of Texas, Austin	Postwar Italian cinema and literary adaptation		
Humanities	Latin American Literature	Rolena Adorno	University of Michigan	Renaissance humanism in early colonial Mexico		
Humanities	Linguistics	John Michael Haiman	University of Manitoba	Sarcasm		
Humanities	Linguistics	Igor A. Mel'čuk	University of Montreal	Linguistic semantics in the framework of meaning-text theory		
Humanities	Literary Criticism	Terry Castle	Stanford University	Attitudes towards ghosts in literature and philosophy since the Enlightenment		
Humanities	Literary Criticism	Carol Frances Jacobs	SUNY Buffalo			
Humanities	Literary Criticism	Gabriele Maria Johanna Schwab	UC Irvine	"Otherness" of poetic language		
Humanities	Medieval History	Marcia L. Colish	Oberlin College			
Humanities	Medieval Literature	Kent Emery Jr.	University of Notre Dame	Life and works of Denys of Ryckel		
Humanities	Medieval Literature	Richard Firth Green	University of Western Ontario	Literature and law in late 14th-century England		
Humanities	Medieval Literature	James L. Miller	University of Western Ontario			
Humanities	Music Research	Herbert Kellman	University of Illinois	Vatican Chigi codex as a document of music and art in Renaissance Burgundy and Spain		
Humanities	Music Research	Roger Parker	Cornell University	Analytical essays on Verdi and Puccini		
Humanities	Music Research	Robert W. Wason	University of Rochester	Music of Anton Webern		
Humanities	Near Eastern Studies	Michael Cook	Princeton University	Muslim duty of forbidding what is wrong		
Humanities	Near Eastern Studies	Yosef Hayim Yerushalmi	Columbia University	Freud's Moses and Monotheism		
Humanities	Philosophy	Clark N. Glymour	Carnegie Mellon University and University of Pittsburgh	Logical studies of discovery		
Humanities	Philosophy	Thomas M. Scanlon Jr.	Harvard University	"Contractualist" moral philosophy		
Humanities	Philosophy	Scott Soames	Princeton University	Truth and meaning		
Humanities	Religion	Peter Brown	Princeton University	Poverty and power in the later Roman empire		
Humanities	Renaissance History	Stanley Chojnacki	Michigan State University			
Humanities	Russian History	David L. Ransel	Indiana University	Comparative study of infant mortality in Russia and the USSR		
Humanities	Slavic Literature	Stanislaw Baranczak	Harvard University	History of Polish poetry since World War II		
Humanities	Slavic Literature	David Bethea	University of Wisconsin-Madison			
Humanities	South Asian Studies	Nicholas B. Dirks	University of Michigan	Colonial representation of India		
Humanities	Theatre Arts	William B. Worthen	University of Texas-Austin			
Humanities	United States History	William H. Chafe	Duke University			
Humanities	United States History	Steven Hahn	UC San Diego	Black political experience in the rural South, 1860-1900		
Humanities	United States History	Hendrik A. Hartog	University of Wisconsin-Madison			
Humanities	United States History	Carol F. Karlsen	University of Michigan	Experience of Iroquois women in early American history		
Humanities	United States History	Walter F. LaFeber	Cornell University	Foreign affairs and the American Constitution since the 1780s		
Humanities	United States History	Roy Rosenzweig	George Mason University			
Natural Sciences	Applied Mathematics	Steven Alan Orszag	Princeton University	Turbulent flows		
Natural Sciences	Applied Mathematics	Katepalli R. Sreenivasan	Yale University	Origin, dynamics, and control of fluid turbulence		
Natural Sciences	Astronomy & Astrophysics	Richard V. E. Lovelace	Cornell University	Astrophysics		
Natural Sciences	Astronomy & Astrophysics	Stuart L. Shapiro	Cornell University	Astrophysics and general relativity		
Natural Sciences	Chemistry	David E. Cane	Brown University			
Natural Sciences	Chemistry	F. Albert Cotton	Texas A&M University	Multiple bonding between metal atoms	Also won in 1956	
Natural Sciences	Chemistry	Arthur B. Ellis	University of Wisconsin-Madison			
Natural Sciences	Chemistry	Michael L. Klein	University of Pennsylvania	Structure and dynamics of disordered molecular systems		
Natural Sciences	Chemistry	Peter Joseph Ortoleva	Indiana University	Geochemical self-organization		
Natural Sciences	Earth Science	Thomas Dunne	University of Washington			
Natural Sciences	Engineering	Douglas A. Lauffenburger	University of Pennsylvania	Cellular bioengineering		
Natural Sciences	Engineering	Richard M. Osgood Jr.	Columbia University	Laser-stimulated chemical interactions on solid surfaces		
Natural Sciences	Mathematics	Sylvain E. Cappell	New York University	Topology		
Natural Sciences	Mathematics	Peter Wai-Kwong Li	University of Utah	Analytical methods in differential geometry		
Natural Sciences	Mathematics	Donald A. Martin	UCLA	Mathematical logic		
Natural Sciences	Medicine & Health	Oliver W. Sacks	Beth Abraham Hospital	Influence of culture on the neurological processes underlying Tourette syndrome		
Natural Sciences	Molecular & Cellular Biology	L. Luca Cavalli-Sforza	Stanford University	Genetic predisposition to AIDS		
Natural Sciences	Molecular & Cellular Biology	Tobin J. Marks	Northwestern University			
Natural Sciences	Molecular & Cellular Biology	George L. McLendon	University of Rochester	Protein-electron transfer		
Natural Sciences	Molecular & Cellular Biology	George Nicholls Somero	Scripps Institution of Oceanography			
Natural Sciences	Neuroscience	Glenn I. Hatton	Michigan State University			
Natural Sciences	Organismic Biology and Ecology	Hal Caswell	Woods Hole Oceanographic Institution	Models of ecological communities in patchy environments		
Natural Sciences	Organismic Biology and Ecology	Michael E. Gilpin	UC San Diego			
Natural Sciences	Organismic Biology and Ecology	Peter Michael Kareiva	University of Washington	Empirical and theoretical studies in ecology		
Natural Sciences	Organismic Biology and Ecology	Katharine B. Payne	Cornell University	Infrasonic calls of elephants		
Natural Sciences	Physics	Mary K. Gaillard	UC Berkeley	Particle physics and superstring theory		
Natural Sciences	Physics	Steven G. Louie	UC Berkeley	Theoretical condensed-matter physics		
Natural Sciences	Plant Sciences	Phyllis D. Coley	University of Utah	Patterns of susceptibility and defense in young leaves, and how ecological environments affect plants in diverse tropical areas		
Natural Sciences	Plant Sciences	Daniel J. Cosgrove	Pennsylvania State University	Role of membrane channels in regulating pressure and growth in plants		
Natural Sciences	Statistics	Louis Gordon	University of Southern California	Detection of change-points in sequences		
Social Sciences	Anthropology & Cultural Studies	Roderick J. McIntosh	Rice University			
Social Sciences	Anthropology & Cultural Studies	Katharine V. C. Milton	UC Berkeley	Comparative dietary ecology of forest-living Amazon tribes		
Social Sciences	Anthropology & Cultural Studies	Emilio F. Moran	Indiana University	Use and conservation of nature by Native Amazonians		
Social Sciences	Economics	Stephen M. Goldfeld	Princeton University	Effects of rationing and bailouts		
Social Sciences	Economics	Manuel Pastor Jr.	Occidental College			
Social Sciences	Education	James W. Stigler	University of Chicago	Culture and mathematics learning		
Social Sciences	Geography & Environmental Studies	Susan Hanson	Clark University	Geography of women's employment in metropolitan areas		
Social Sciences	Law	Paul D. Carrington	Duke University			
Social Sciences	Law	David J. Luban	University of Maryland			
Social Sciences	Political Science	David Collier	UC Berkeley	New perspectives on the comparative method		
Social Sciences	Political Science	Robert H. Salisbury	Washington University in St. Louis	American pluralism in theory and practice		
Social Sciences	Political Science	John Waterbury	Princeton University	Public sector enterprise in Egypt, India, Mexico, and Turkey		
Social Sciences	Psychology	Martin Daly	McMaster University	How and why parents favor certain offspring over others		
Social Sciences	Psychology	Jennifer J. Freyd	University of Oregon	Shareable mental representations		
Social Sciences	Psychology	Susan Sugarman	Princeton University	Freud on the origins of mind		
Social Sciences	Psychology	Edgar Basil Zurif	Brandeis University	Neurological organization of language processes		
Social Sciences	Sociology	Paul J. DiMaggio	Yale University	Social organization of the arts in the US since 1860		
Social Sciences	Sociology	Gary G. Hamilton	UC Davis	Institutional foundations of Chinese capitalism		
Social Sciences	Sociology	Theda Skocpol	Harvard University	Politics of social provision in the US since the 1880s		

== 1989 Latin American and Caribbean Fellows ==
Category	Field of Study	Fellow	Institutional association	Research topic	Notes	Ref
Creative Arts	Choreography	Garth Fagan	Garth Fagan Bucket Dance and SUNY Brockport	Developing his choreography, teaching, and dance vocabulary		
Creative Arts	Fiction	Ana Lydia Vega	Universidad de Puerto Rico	Writing		
Creative Arts	Musical Composition	Julio Martín Viera		Composing		
Humanities	Fine Arts Research	Jorge Montealegre Iturra	Sociedad de Escritores de Chile	Historia del humor gráfico de Chile (published 2008)		
Humanities	Iberian & Latin American History	Héctor Aguilar Camín				
Humanities	Iberian & Latin American History	Silvia Rivera Cusicanqui	Universidad Mayor de San Andrés	Community traditions and ethnic identity in the formation of the Bolivian working class		
Humanities	Latin American Literature	María Eugenia Brito	Instituto Profesional de Santiago			
Humanities	Latin American Literature	Ricardo Piglia				
Natural Sciences	Earth Science	Héctor A. Leanza		Mesozoic Trigoniid bivalve associations		
Natural Sciences	Medicine & Health	Rafael Apitz-Castro	Venezuelan Institute for Scientific Research	Effectiveness of garlic extracts in the prevention of thrombus formation		
Natural Sciences	Medicine & Health	Hugo Alberto Massaldi	Universidad de Buenos Aires			
Natural Sciences	Molecular & Cellular Biology	Alberto Darszon Israel	CINVESTAV	Cell membrane permeability during fertilization		
Natural Sciences	Molecular & Cellular Biology	Alejandro Venegas	Pontificia Universidad Católica de Chile	Development of improved diagnostic systems for typhoid fever		
Natural Sciences	Neuroscience	Federico Bermúdez Rattoni	Universidad Nacional Autónoma de México			
Natural Sciences	Neuroscience	Carlos Libertun	IBYME and Universidad de Buenos Aires	Role of neuropeptides in the central control of water regulation and stress		
Natural Sciences	Physics	Sergio Andrés Hojman	Universidad Nacional Autónoma de México	Exactly solvable problems		
Natural Sciences	Physics	Carlos Raul Ordóñez	Rockefeller University			
Natural Sciences	Physics	Enrique Tirapegui Zurbano	Universidad de Chile	Fluctuations in macroscopic physics		
Natural Sciences	Plant Sciences	Carlos Santiago Andreo	Universidad Nacional de Rosario	Regulation and reaction mechanism of key enzymes in photosynthesis		
Natural Sciences	Plant Sciences	Fernando Omar Zuloaga	Instituto de Botánica Darwinion	Systematics of neotropical grasses		
Social Sciences	Anthropology & Cultural Studies	Doris Heyden	Instituto Nacional de Antropología e Historia	Aztec society		
Social Sciences	Economics	Aloisio Pessoa de Araujo	Instituto de Matemática Pura e Aplicada	Mathematical economics		
Social Sciences	Economics	Gustavo Garza Villarreal	Colegio de México	Macroeconomic dynamics of the tertiary sector in Mexico City		
Social Sciences	Education	Carlos Tünnermann Bernheim			Also won in 1973	
Social Sciences	Law	Carlos Santiago Nino	Universidad de Buenos Aires		Also won in 1976	
Social Sciences	Law	Roberto dos Santos Vieira	Universidade Federal do Amazonas	Comparative environmental law		
Social Sciences	Political Science	Joaquín Fermandois	Pontificia Universidad Católica de Chile and Universidad Católica de Valparaíso	Chile and the United States, 1932-1952		
Social Sciences	Sociology	Marcial Antonio Riquelme		Problems of transition from authoritarianism to democracy in Paraguay		
Social Sciences	Sociology	Sara Sefchovich	Universidad Nacional Autónoma de México	Wrote her first novel, Demasiado amor (published 1990)		

== See also ==
- Guggenheim Fellowship
- List of Guggenheim Fellowships awarded in 1988
- List of Guggenheim Fellowships awarded in 1990
