= Kuthu (disambiguation) =

Kuthu or Kuththu is the short form of the music genre dappankuthu.

Kuthu or Kuththu may also refer to:

- Kuthu, 2004 Tamil language film
- "Kuthu Fire", a song by Vidya Vox
- "Arabic Kuthu", a song from the 2022 film Beast
