= Samore =

Samore is a surname. Notable people with the surname include:

- Gary Samore, Barack Obama's White House Coordinator for Arms Control and Weapons of Mass Destruction
- Antonio Samorè (1905–1983), Italian Cardinal of the Catholic Church
- Samori Ture (c. 1830 – 1900), founder of the Wassoulou Empire
- Sam Samore, American artist
