= Blell =

Blell is a surname. Notable people with this surname include:

- Dianne Blell (born 1943), American multimedia artist and photographer
- Frieda Blell (1874–1951), German landscape painter
- Joe Blell, Sierra Leonean politician
