= Envy =

Pain at the sight of another's good fortune

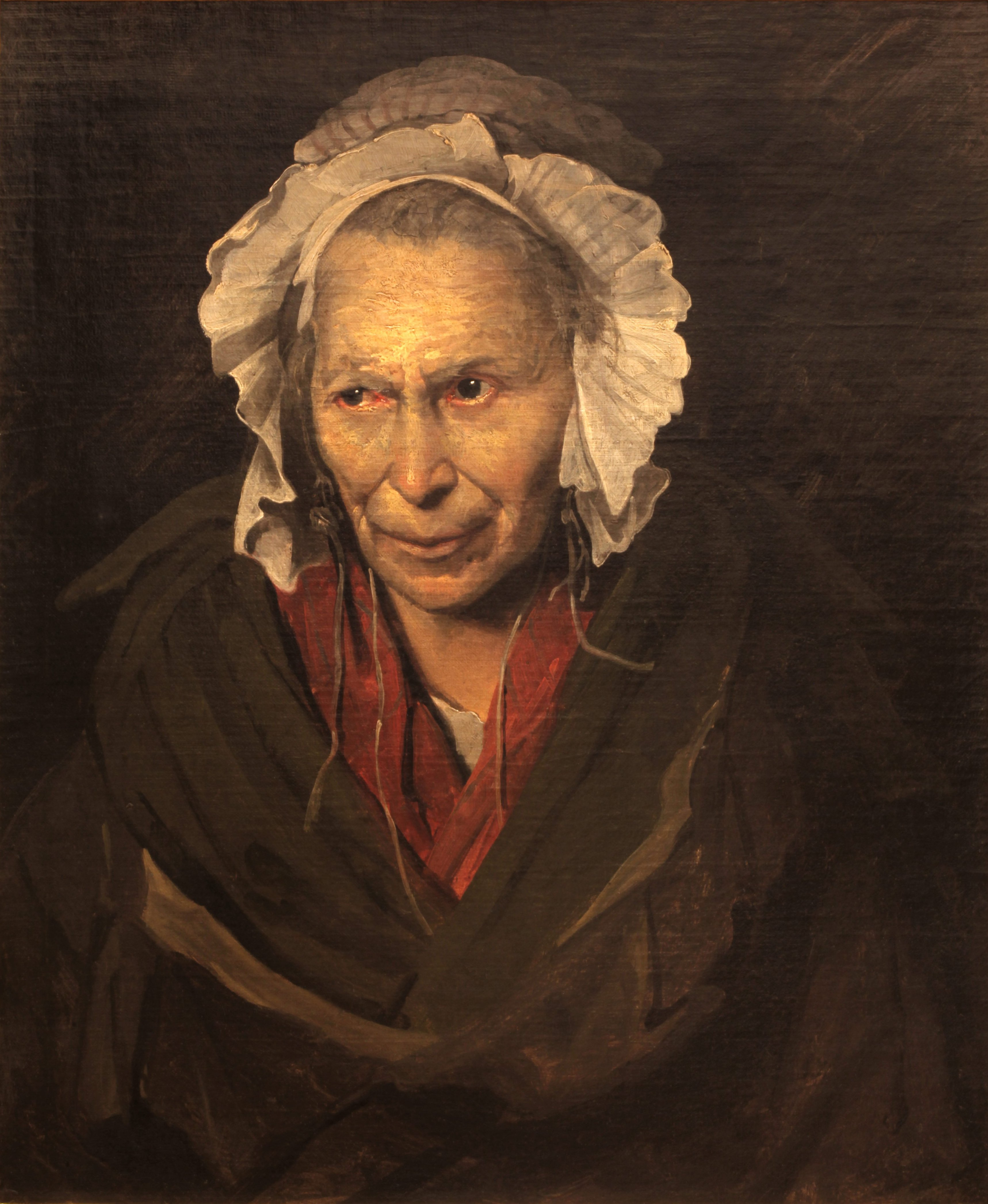
Portrait of a demented woman or The Monomaniac of Envy, by Théodore Géricault, c. 1819–1822

Envy is an emotion which occurs when a person lacks another's quality, skill, achievement, or possession and either desires it or wishes that the other lacked it. Envy can also refer to the wish for another person to lack something one already possesses so as to remove the equality of possession between both parties.

Aristotle defined envy as pain at the sight of another's good fortune, stirred by "those who have what we ought to have". Bertrand Russell said that envy was one of the most potent causes of unhappiness. The conditions under which envy occurs, how people deal with it, and whether it can inspire people to emulate those they envy remain as subjects of modern research.

Jealousy differs from envy in that jealousy is usually focused on emotional relationships and the fear of losing them, and envy is focused on a desire for other people's things or situations.

== Types of envy ==
Some languages, such as Dutch, distinguish between "benign envy" (benijden in Dutch) and "malicious envy" (afgunst), pointing to the possibility that there are two subtypes of envy. Research shows that malicious envy is an unpleasant emotion that causes the envious person to want to bring down the better-off even at their own cost, while benign envy involves recognition of others being better-off, but causes the person to aspire to be as good. Benign envy is still a negative emotion in the sense that it feels unpleasant. According to researchers, benign envy can provide emulation, improvement motivation, positive thoughts about the other person, and admiration. This type of envy, if dealt with correctly, can positively affect a person's future by motivating them to be a better person and to succeed. There is some discussion on whether the subtypes should be seen as distinct forms of envy, as some argue that the action tendencies (to damage someone else's position for malicious envy and to improve one's own position for benign envy) are not part of how the emotion is defined, while others think action tendencies are an integral part of an emotion. Those who do not think subtypes of envy exist argue that the situation affects how envy leads to behavior; while those who do think subtypes exist think that the situation affects which subtype of envy is experienced.

== Evolutionary role ==
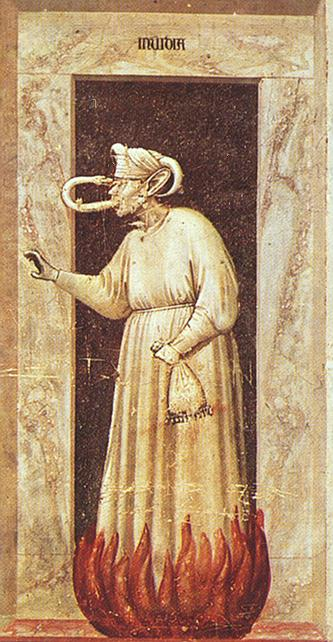
Invidia, allegorical painting by Giotto di Bondone, c. 1305–1306

Following Charles Darwin's 1859 book advancing the theory of evolution by natural selection, his 1872 work, The Expression of the Emotions in Man and Animals advanced the theory that there has been an evolution of emotion which developed in animals for the survival value emotions offer. In 1998, neuroscientist Jaak Panksepp provided data demonstrating that mammalian species are equipped with brains capable of generating emotional experiences. Subsequent research in the behavioral sciences have provided insights into emotions such as envy and their impact on cognition and behavior. For example, consistent with envy being a motivation, empirical research shows that envy concentrates cognitive resources, focusing the subject's attention towards collecting information on the social target and enhancing the ability to recall such information. In primate research, Frans de Waal conducted long-term research demonstrating that chimpanzees as well as distantly related primates such as brown capuchin monkeys have a finely honed sense of justice within their social group, and that the key emotion used to measure and regulate fair outcomes is envy. De Waal's research leads him to argue that without envy motivating our interest in making social comparisons, there would be no reason to care about fairness and justice.

Based on a model of evolved responses to those who are better off, Sznycer has argued that envy increases support for economic redistribution.

== Regarding possessions or status ==
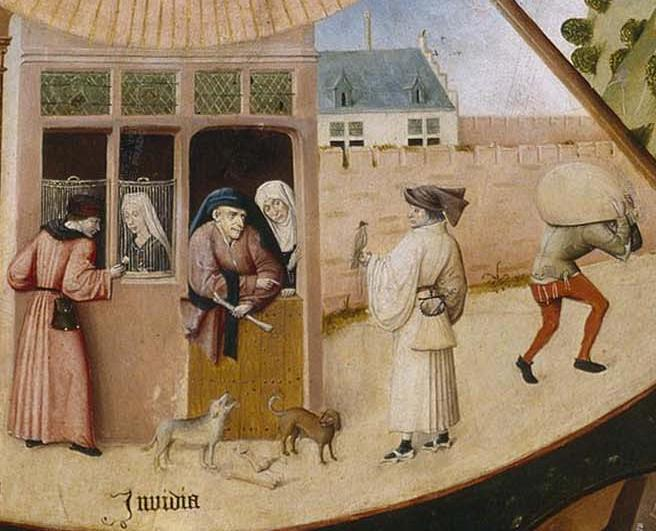
Hieronymus Bosch, The Seven Deadly Sins and the Four Last Things (Invidia)

Often, envy involves a motive to "outdo or undo the rival's advantages". In part, this type of envy may be based on materialistic possessions rather than psychological states. Basically, people find themselves experiencing an overwhelming emotion due to someone else owning or possessing desirable items that they do not. Feelings of envy in this situation would occur in the forms of emotional pain, a lack of self-worth, and a lowered self-esteem and well-being.

In Old Money, Nelson W. Aldrich Jr. states:

Envy is so integral and so painful a part of what animates human behavior in market societies that many people have forgotten the full meaning of the word, simplifying it into one of the symptoms of desire. It is that [a symptom of desire], which may be why it flourishes in market societies: democracies of desire, they might be called, with money for ballots, stuffing permitted. But envy is more or less than desire. It begins with an almost frantic sense of emptiness inside oneself, as if the pump of one's heart were sucking on air. One has to be blind to perceive the emptiness, of course, but that's just what envy is, a selective blindness. Invidia, Latin for envy, translates as "nonsight", and Dante had the envious plodding along under cloaks of lead, their eyes sewn shut with leaden wire. What they are blind to is what they have, God-given and humanly nurtured, in themselves.

== Overcoming ==
Envy may negatively affect the closeness and satisfaction of relationships. Overcoming envy might be similar to dealing with other negative emotions (anger, resentment, etc.). Individuals experiencing anger often seek professional treatment (anger management) to help understand why they feel the way they do and how to cope. Subjects experiencing envy often have a skewed perception on how to achieve true happiness. By helping people to change these perceptions, they will be more able to understand the real meaning of fortune and satisfaction with what they do have. According to Lazarus, "coping is an integral feature of the emotion process". There are very few theories that emphasize the coping process for emotions as compared to the information available concerning the emotion itself.

There are numerous styles of coping, of which there has been a significant amount of research done; for example, avoidant versus approach. Coping with envy can be similar to coping with anger. The issue must be addressed cognitively in order to work through the emotion. According to the research done by Salovey and Rodin (1988), "more effective strategies for reducing initial envy appear to be stimulus-focused rather than self-focused". Salovey and Rodin (1988) also suggest "self-bolstering (e.g., "thinking about my good qualities") may be an effective strategy for moderating these self-deprecating thoughts and muting negative affective reactions".

== Benefits ==
Russell believed that envy may be a driving force behind the movement of economies and must be endured to achieve the "keep up with the Joneses" system. He believed this is what helps to maintain "democracy" as a system in which no one can achieve more than anyone else. Attended to, envy may inform a person about who they admire and what they want. Benign envy may lead a person to work harder to achieve more success.

== In adolescence ==
Envy becomes apparent in children from an early stage, and adults, while equally susceptible to this emotion, demonstrate a higher level of proficiency in disguising it. Envy plays a significant role in the development of adolescents. Comparing oneself is a universal aspect of human nature. Comparison can be applied across many different subjects. Applications such as physical attributes, material possessions, or intellectual abilities could enable a tendency for comparisons against one another's own experiences. However, children are more likely to envy over material objects such as shoes, video games, high-value mobile phones, etc. Children believe these material objects are correlated to their social status.

Social status has been found to have a strong connection with self-esteem. An adolescent's self-esteem is very fragile during early years and is heavily impacted by peer opinion. If a child is comfortable with who they are and self-confident they are less likely to become envious of others' material objects, because they do not self-identify with materials. Material objects are not the only things that adolescents become envious over; however, it is the most prevalent.

As children get older they develop stronger non-materialistic envy such as activities, physical appearance, achievement, and popularity. Sometimes envious feelings are internalized in children, having a negative impact on their self-esteem and cause feelings of inadequacy.

A child's identity is formed during their early years. Identity development is considered the central task during adolescence. When children grow up understanding their identity, they are able to better define what their strengths and weaknesses are while comparing themselves to others. Comparison can have two outcomes: it can be healthy in aiding in self-improvement or it can be unhealthy and result in envy, which can develop into depression. This is why self-exploration and identity development are critical in adolescent years.

If a child is showing signs of unhealthy envy, it is best to teach the child productive ways to handle these emotions at an early age. It is much easier to teach a child how to control their emotions while they are young rather than allowing them to develop a habit that is hard to break when they are older.

== In adulthood ==
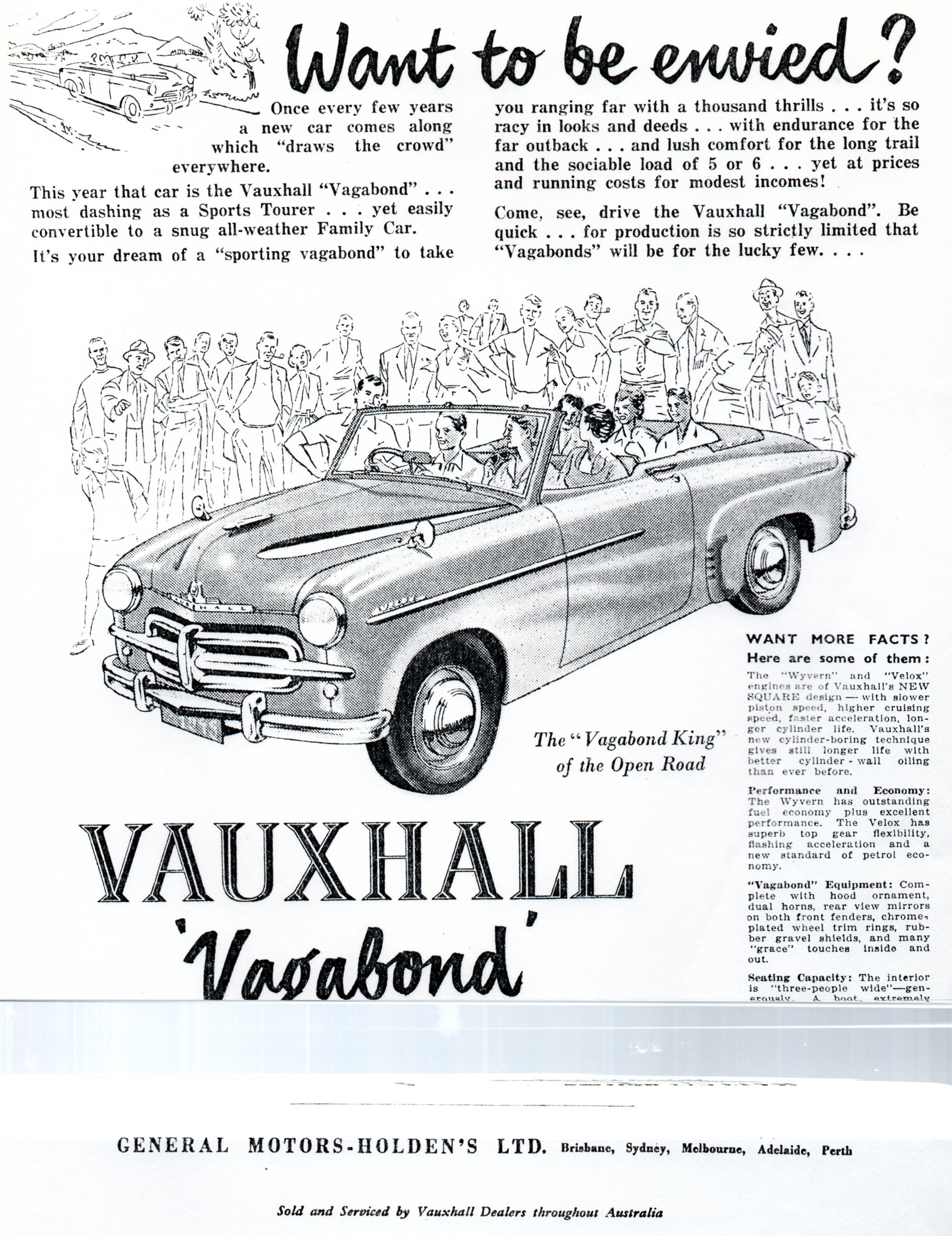
Advertisement using envy to promote sales

The things that make people envious change throughout their lifetime. Studies have shown that the younger the person, the more likely they are to be envious of others. Adults under the age of 30 are more likely to experience envy compared to those 30 years and older. However, what people become envious over differs across adulthood.

Younger adults, under the age of 30, have been found to envy others' social status, relationships, and attractiveness. Typically, at this point in life, the person begins to accept who they are as an individual and compare themselves to others less often. However, they still envy others, just over different aspects in life, such as career or salary. Studies have shown a decrease in envy as a person ages; however, envious feelings over money was the only thing that consistently increased as a person got older. As a person ages, they begin to accept their social status. On some occasions, the individual does not and can, over time, form severe mental issues.

== In philosophy ==
Aristotle, in Rhetoric, defined envy (φθόνος phthonos) as "the pain caused by the good fortune of others", while Kant, in Metaphysics of Morals, defined it as "a reluctance to see our own well-being overshadowed by another's because the standard we use to see how well off we are is not the intrinsic worth of our own well-being but how it compares with that of others".

== Religious views ==
=== In Christianity ===
Envy is one of the seven deadly sins in Roman Catholicism.

Christian author and psychologist Dr. William Backus described envy as a sin that promises nothing good. "Most sins offer something you think you want...Pride offers the euphoria of preeminence, anger promises the joy of revenge, greed promises the security of abundant wealth, sloth promises welcome release from the chains of effort...But envy is the exception. Of all the vices only envy never promises or delivers anything but bitterness and misery."

=== In Hinduism ===
In the Bhagavad Gita, Krishna said "One who does not envy but is a compassionate friend to all ... is very dear to me."

=== In Islam ===
According to a Da'if narration in Hadith, Muhammad said: "Envy consumes good deeds just as fire consumes wood, and charity extinguishes bad deeds just as water extinguishes fire. Prayer is the light of the believer and fasting is a shield against the fire" (Sunan Ibn Majah 4210).

Muhammad said, "Do not envy each other, do not hate each other, do not oppose each other, and do not cut relations, rather be servants of Allah as brothers. It is not permissible for a Muslim to disassociate from his brother for more than three days such that they meet and one ignores the other, and the best of them is the one who initiates the salaam." Sahih al-Bukhari [Eng. Trans. 8/58 no. 91], Sahih Muslim [Eng. Trans. 4/1360 no. 6205, 6210]

== Cultural references ==
In English-speaking cultures, envy is often associated with the color green, as in "green with envy". The phrase "green-eyed monster" refers to jealousy, not envy. This image is from Shakespeare's Othello, when the villain Iago warns the titular character, "O beware, my lord, of jealousy; It is the green-eyed monster which doth mock the meat it feeds on".

In other cultures, yellow is the primary color of envy, jealousy, and stinginess and other egotistical behaviors, with green, especially bile green (a sickly yellow-green) taking second place.

In the Japanese manga series Fullmetal Alchemist, the character Envy is one of the seven homunculi named after the seven deadly sins.

The character of Zelena on ABC's Once Upon a Time takes on the title "The Wicked Witch of the West" after envy itself dyes her skin in the episode "It's Not Easy Being Green".

In Nelson W. Aldrich Jr.'s Old Money, he states that people who suffer from a case of malicious envy are blind to what good things they already have, thinking they have nothing, causing them to feel emptiness and despair.

== See also ==
- Competition
- Envy-freeness
- Jealousy
- Penis envy
- Resentment
- Self-envy
- Seven deadly sins
- Spite (sentiment)
- Womb and vagina envy
