= Rafael E. López-Corvo =

Venezuelan-Canadian physician and psychiatrist

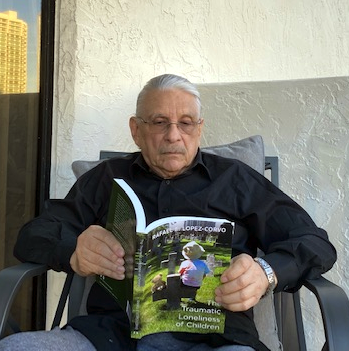
- In his private practice in Toronto.
- Born: Caicara de Maturín, Monagas, Venezuela
- Scientific career
- Fields: Psychoanalysis, Psychology, Medicine, Psychiatry

Rafael E. Lopez-Corvo is a Venezuelan-born medical doctor, psychiatrist and psychoanalyst. He is a former associate professor at Ottawa and McGill Universities and Program Director of Child and Adolescents Unite at the Douglas Hospital, McGill University in Montreal, Canada. He was also a member of the editorial board of the International Journal of Psycho-Analysis for Latin-America. Likewise, he is a training and supervising psychoanalyst for the International Psychoanalytic Association as well as the Canadian, Venezuelan and American Psychoanalytic Societies.

Among his many articles on addictions, he wrote A Kleinian understanding of Addictions that challenges the idea that there is a single, distinct unconscious profile that defines drug addiction, as opposed to other forms of personality disorders such as borderline or narcissistic types. Rather, it is argued that there are certain variables that are typically present in individuals who use drugs, either legally or illegally, to reduce their levels of anxiety.

He created the concept of Self-envy that understands all envies as originally intrapsychic. He explores the destructive consequence of envy acted out against creative aspects of the self. His observations of self-envy in borderline structures led him to recognize the value of intrapsychic interpretation. He proposed that self-envy is caused by the interaction of elements of the Oedipus complex.

Lopez-Corvo is also a scholar in the psychoanalytic approach of Wilfred Bion, whom he considers has laid the foundations of future psychoanalysis.

He wrote a Dictionary of the Work of W. R. Bion that is a comprehensive guide to W.R. Bion's often obscure terms and meanings, offering insight into the conscious and unconscious factors that may have influenced his work.

In Wild thoughts in search of a thinker he explores the connections between Classical Psychoanalysis (mainly Freud, Klein and Winnicott) and Bion's novel theories. It seeks to make Bion more accessible to readers and to place his theories in a broader, more comprehensive perspective. It acknowledges the progressive epistemological evolution between the contributions of Freud, Klein and Bion, and emphasizes that psychoanalysis, like religion, represents different viewers rather than different beliefs.

In The Traumatised and Non-Traumatised States of the Personality he states that humans have a tendency to give inanimate objects qualities of life and take away the true sense of life from humans. This is seen in objects of worship or idealization of dead persons. W.R. Bion's conceptualization of "absences" is similar to the discovery of negative numbers in mathematics. He linked "no-thing" to space and "no-present" to time, as the place where something used to be or the time when something used to happen. This chapter looks at a clinical case to show how bivalent emotions linked to bivalent partial objects are uncovered, with interpretation to reach the presence of absent primary objects such as the penis or the breast.

Also, the concept of "pre-conceptual trauma" which supposes that every individual must confront the task of containing their Oedipus complex, which is modified by the pre-conceptual traumas they experience early in life. These traumas are ubiquitous and occur before the individual has a developed mind capable of providing them with meaning and before the maternal reverie can intuitively protect them.

== Bibliography ==
- Inteligencia, Afecto y Nivel Social, Monte Avila, Caracas. ("Intelligence, Affect and Social Level", Research on emotional development, of children, sponsored by the Ford Foundation, 1970
- El Niño y su Inteligencia, Monte Avila, Caracas. ("Intelligence in Children", Comparison between emotional (Melanie Klein), and cognitive (J. Piaget) development. Translated to Portuguese, Edi. Cultrix (1975), 1970
- Símbolo y Mutación, Monte Avila, Caracas. ("Symbol and Mutation", A structuralist vision of psychoanalytical theory and practice), 1979
- La Tercera Revolución Psiquiátrica, Editorial Ateneo, Caracas. (A Psychoanalytical understanding of Therapeutic Communities), 1979
- Y el Diablo También es una Mujer, Editorial Planeta, Caracas. ("And the Devil also is a Woman": a psychological essay about the aggressive aspects of femininity), 1989
- God is a Woman, Jason Aronson, New York. (A psychological essay about the libidinal aspects of femininity), 1996 (Translated to Spanish: Dios es una Mujer, Seix Barral, Madrid. (Seven editions)
- Adictos y Adicciones, Monte Avila, Caracas. ("Addicts and Addictions", A psychoanalytical understanding of addictions), 1990
- A Kleinian understanding of Addictions, Monograph: Melanie Klein and Object Relations Journal, Toronto Institute for Studies in Education, Vol. 11, N° 1, 1993
- La Maldición Eterna, Monte Avila, Caracas. ("The Eternal Damnation", a study of the history of drugs and family dynamics in addict patients), 1993
- La Rehabilitación del Adicto, Nueva Visión, Buenos Aires. (A comprehensive recount of several forms of rehabilitationfor addictive behavior), 1994
- Self-Envy, Therapy and the Divided Inner World, Jason Aronson, New York, (Translated to Spanish, Edit. Planeta 1996), 1994
- The Dictionary of the Work of W. R. Bion, Karnak Books, London. (Translated to Spanish, Biblioteca Nueva, Madrid; Translated to Italian, Borla, Roma), 2002
- Wild thoughts in search of a thinker, Karnak Books, London.
- The Woman Within, A Psychoanalytic Understanding of femininity, Karnac Books, 2008
- The Traumatised and Non-Traumatised States of the Personality, an Understanding using Bion's Approach, Karnac Books, London 2014.
- Estados traumatizado y no traumatizado de la personalidad, una comprensión clínica siguiendo aspectos de Wilfred Bion, Ediciones Biebel, Buenos Aires, 2017.
- The Traumatic Loneliness of Children Free Association Books, London, 2020.

== Notes ==
1. Kaley, H. (2010) Releasing the Vindicated Eve. Psychology of Women Quarterly
