= Self-envy =

Psychoanalytic concept

Self-envy is a psychoanalytic concept developed by Rafael López-Corvo, who argues that it is crucial for the understanding of disorders of the self that are manifested in addictions, acting out, and inhibition of creativity. This concept is based on the use of object relations theory, which many psychoanalysts view as a fundamental tool for examining the architecture of the internal world that describes behavior as influenced by the multiple interactions of early representations of self and others operating in our inner selves.

== Overview ==
Self-envy is produced by 'child part self-objects', self representations from early development that remain split off from the self and harbor destructive and envious feelings toward the creative aspects of the self and results from direct aggressive attacks by these childhood self-objects against the part of the self identified with a harmonious mother-father or parent-sibling relationship.

The internal dynamics of self-envy cause unconscious conflict, dissociation, and disturbances of the self, all of which underlie severe psychopathologies, such as repetitive destructive behavior, and even the living of seemingly normal but constricted lives. López-Corvo suggests that the psychoanalytic interpretation of such patients, for whom one part of the self is pitted against another, should address directly the phenomenon of a war within the internal self.

== Usage ==
W.C.M. Scott first used this term in 1975 in his article "Remembering sleep and dreaming: self-envy and envy of dreams and dreaming" in the International Review of Psychoanalysis, Vol. 2/3 (1975): 333–354. López-Corvo credits Scott in his paper "About Interpretation of Self-Envy" in the same journal (1992): 73, 719, and also in his book Self-Envy: Therapy and the Divided Inner World, which also draws from Melanie Klein, Wilfred Bion, and other object-relations theorists in order to develop its more extended argument.

== See also ==
- Envy
- Outline of self

== Articles and books ==
- Berman A (1999). "Self-envy and the concealment of inner resources". Isr J Psychiatry Relat Sci. 36 (3): 203–14, discussion 215–22. PMID 10593059.
- Spillius EB (1997). "Self-Envy: Therapy and the Divided Inner World (Review)". Int J Psychoanal. 78: 1254–7.
- López-Corvo RE (1992). "About Interpretation of Self-Envy". Int J Psychoanal. 73: 719–728. PMID 1483850.
- Rafael E. López-Corvo Self-Envy, Therapy and the Divided Inner World, Jason Aronson, New York, 1994
- López-Corvo RE (1999). "Self-Envy and Intrapsychic Interpretation". Psychoanal Q. 68 (2): 209–219. doi:10.1002/j.2167-4086.1999.tb00531.x. PMID 10432531.
