= Cara De Silva =

American food writer (1939–2022)

- Born: Carol Eileen Krawetz; March 3, 1939; Manhattan, New York, U.S.
- Died: December 7, 2022 (aged 83)

Carol Eileen Krawetz (March 3, 1939 – December 7, 2022), known by her pen name Cara De Silva, was American writer and food historian. She was known for her writings on food and for editing In Memory's Kitchen: A Legacy from the Women of Terezin, a collection of recipes from the women in Terezin concentration camp.

== Early life ==
De Silva was born on March 3, 1939, in Manhattan. Her parents were Jewish immigrants; her mother was a sculptor. Her father immigrated to the United States from the area near the Polish and Russian border, and worked for the International Ladies Garment Workers Union. As a child she participated in Yiddish theater, and adopted the stage name Cara De Silva that she used as her pen name while writing as an adult. De Silva received her undergraduate degree from Hunter College, and then a master's degree from the City College of New York in 1996. She also studied medieval English literature at Rutgers University.

== Career ==
De Silva was known for her writing that reported both on the food at restaurants and the experience of being at the restaurant itself. She wrote first for Newsday where she wrote a column focusing on small and relatively unknown places in New York. She went on to report for a variety of publications including Saveur and The New York Times.

De Silva is best known for editing the book, In Memory's Kitchen: a legacy from the women of Terezin, which gathered recipes from women in the Terezin concentration camp. The recipes were compiled by Mina Pachter. Before she died of starvation in 1944, she entrusted the roughly 70 recipes to her friend to bring to her daughter Anny Pachter Stern, who before the war had emigrated to Palestine. The original recipes were written by hand in German and Czech, and were translated into English. She first wrote about the collection of recipes in 1991 in Newsday, a Long Island newspaper. De Silva was turned down by 32 publishers before the book was accepted for publication by the publishing company Jason Aronson in 1996. The recipes serve as a historical document of the Holocaust, and DeSilva noted that the book was not a cookbook, as the recipes could be incomplete or confusing, but was a Holocaust document and a record of what she called "psychological resistance". The book became a best seller and was named to the New York Times list of notable books of the year in 1996. After the publication of the book, De Silva gave lectures about the book and its origin in places throughout the United States.

De Silva died in New York City on December 7, 2022.

== Selected publications ==
- DeSilva, Cara, ed. (1996). In memory's kitchen : a legacy from the women of Terezín (First ed.). Lanham, Md.: Rowman & Littlefield. ISBN 0-7425-4646-2. OCLC 70998659.
- De Silva, Cara (2008). "Fusion City: From Mt. Olympus Bagels to Puerto Rican Lasagna and Beyond". In Hauck-Lawson, Annie; Lomonaco, Jonathan Deutsch Foreword by Michael (eds.). Gastropolis: Food and New York City. Columbia University Press. ISBN 978-0-231-51006-6.

== Awards and honors ==
De Silva was twice honored by the Association of Food Journalists for food feature writing, in 1992 she received first prize and in 1995 she received third prize. In 2000 De Silva was nominated by the James Beard Foundation for her writing A Fork in the Road Letters on Traveling and Dining.
