= María Quiteria Ramírez =

Chilean cantinera

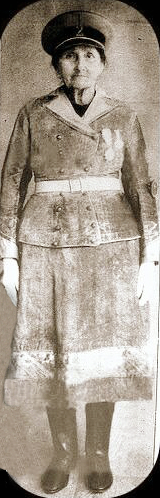
María Quiteria Ramírez

María Quiteria Ramírez(Illapel, c. 1848–1929) was a Chilean cantinera during the War of the Pacific.

== Biography ==
Born around 1848, she was roughly 31 by the time the War of the Pacific broke out in 1879. Years before the war, she embarked from Los Vilos bound for Peru. She lived there for a long time in Iquique and was a friend of Irene Morales. She enlisted as the first cantinera of the 2nd Line Regiment. Under the orders of Eleuterio Ramírez, she participated in the Battle of Tarapacá, where she was captured by the Peruvians and taken to Arica. Her comrades called her "María la Grande" (or "María the Tall") due to her height. She was imprisoned with 50 other compatriots and became popular among them for her sympathy. Later, after the battle of Arica, she regained her freedom and rejoined her regiment; she had a notable role in the battle of Chorrillos, where she began tending to the wounded soldiers and eventually even took a rifle and fought alongside her comrades.

She returned to Santiago in 1881, but was very ill due to advanced liver disease. The remains of María Quiteria are in the city of Ovalle, where they lie in the mausoleum of the heroes of 1879.

== Tributes ==
A neighborhood in her native Illapel bears her name. The publication of the book Participation of Choapa in the War of the Pacific (1879-1884), by the historian Joel Avilez Leiva, gives details, until now unknown, of this cantinera and the context in which she journeyed towards the north of Chile.

== Bibliography ==
- Stuven, Ana María; Joaquín Fermandois, eds. (2011). "La presencia de la mujer chilena en la Guerra del Pacífico". Historia de las mujeres en Chile. Vol. 1. Santiago: Taurus. ISBN 9789563476910.
