= Adrian Piper =

American artist

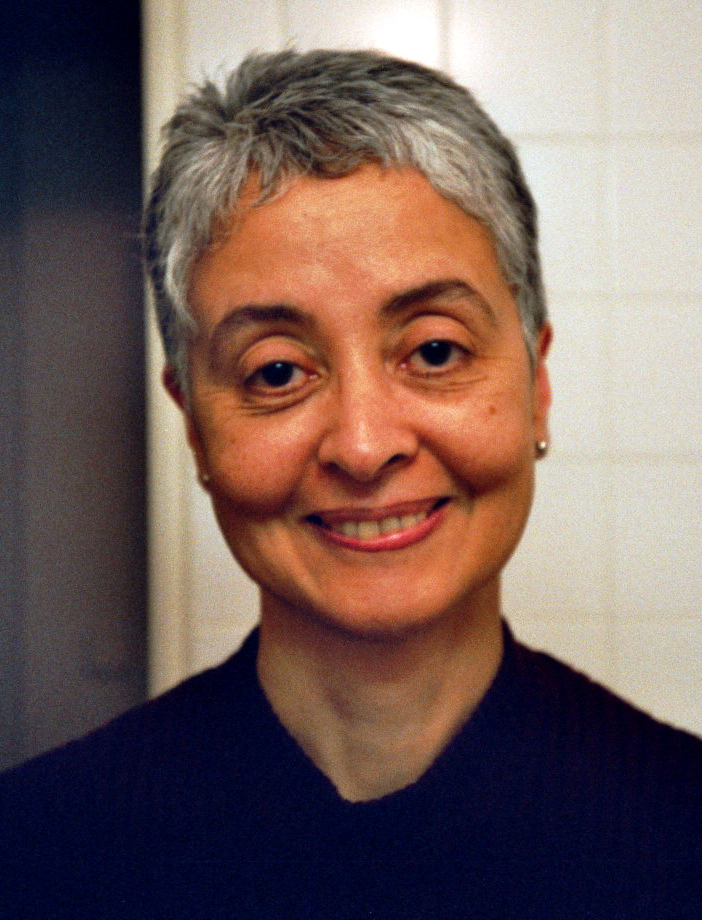
- Piper in 2005
- Born: September 20, 1948 (age 78); New York City, US
- Known for: Founding the Adrian Piper Research Archive (APRA)

Academic background
- Education: School of Visual Arts; City College of New York (BA); Harvard University (MPhil, PhD)
- Doctoral advisor: John Rawls
- Website: www.adrianpiper.com

Adrian Margaret Smith Piper (born September 20, 1948) is an American conceptual artist and Kantian philosopher. Her work addresses how and why those involved in more than one discipline may experience professional ostracism, otherness, racial passing, and racism by using various traditional and non-traditional media to provoke self-analysis. She uses reflection on her own career as an example.

Piper has been awarded various fellowships and medals and has been described as having "profoundly influenced the language and form of Conceptual art". In 2002, she founded the Adrian Piper Research Archive (APRA) in Berlin, Germany, the focus of a foundation that was established in 2009.

== Life and education ==
Piper was born on September 20, 1948, in New York City. She was raised in Manhattan in an upper-middle-class Black family and attended a private school with mostly wealthy, white students. She studied art at the School of Visual Arts and was graduated with an associate's degree in 1969. Piper then studied philosophy at the City College of New York and graduated summa cum laude with a bachelor's in 1974. Piper received a master's in philosophy from Harvard University in 1977 and her doctorate in 1981, supervised by John Rawls. She also studied at the University of Heidelberg. During her philosophical studies, Piper focused on Kant's Critique of Pure Reason; this philosophical inspiration pervades her artworks, most specifically Food for the Spirit (1971).

During the late 1960s and early 1970s Piper was influenced by Sol LeWitt and Yvonne Rainer. She worked at the Seth Siegelaub Gallery, known for its conceptual art exhibitions, in 1969. In 1970, she exhibited in the Museum of Modern Art's exhibition Information, and began to study philosophy in college. Piper has said that she was kicked out of the art world during this time for her race and sex. Her work started to address ostracism, otherness, and attitudes around racism. In an interview with Maurice Berger, published under the title Critique of Pure Racism, Piper asserted that while she finds analysis of racism praiseworthy, she wants her artwork to help people confront their racist views.

Piper’s work was included in the 1971 exhibition Twenty Six Contemporary Women Artists held at The Aldrich Contemporary Art Museum and the 2022 exhibition 52 Artists: A Feminist Milestone also at the Aldrich.

Piper was awarded visual arts fellowships from the National Endowment for the Arts in 1979 and 1982, and a Guggenheim Fellowship in 1989. Piper taught at Wellesley College, Harvard University, Stanford University, University of Michigan, Georgetown University, and University of California, San Diego. In 1987, she became the first female African-American philosophy professor to receive academic tenure in the United States. While she was on unpaid leave in Berlin during 2008, Wellesley College terminated her tenured full professorship because of her refusal to return to the United States while listed as a "Suspicious Traveler" on the U.S. Transportation Security Administration Watch List.

Piper is divorced. She currently lives and works in Berlin, where she runs the Adrian Piper Research Archive. In 2015, she was awarded the Golden Lion for best artist in the international exhibition of the Venice Biennale.

In 2017, Piper received an honorary Doctorate of Fine Arts degree from the Nova Scotia College of Art and Design University.

== Ideology ==
In 1981 Piper published an essay entitled "Ideology, Confrontation and Political Self-Awareness", in which she discusses concepts she explores through her art. In her essay, she contemplates notions of human self-examination and belief structures that serve to "individuate oneself from another." These beliefs begin with our early experiences in the world and go unquestioned until they are attacked by new experiences that break the conformity, introducing doubt—the key to self-examination and belief-revision. Piper argues that the beliefs we tend to hold onto the longest, and often avoid exposing to examination, are those that allow us to maintain an understanding that makes sense to us about who we are and how we exist within the world at large. She points out that these "ideologies" often are responsible for "stupid, insensitive, self-serving [behavior], usually at the expense of other individuals or groups." Piper concludes the essay by telling readers that if considering the points she brings up makes them self-conscious about their political beliefs in the slightest degree, or causes them to have even "the slightest glimmerings of doubt about the veracity of [their] opinions, then [she] will consider [the] piece a roaring success."

Piper's work is largely based on her background in philosophy, including eastern philosophy. Piper started studying and practicing yoga in 1965. Through her education, she gained interest into the eastern yogic traditions of Hindu philosophy. Many of her works either allude to or directly incorporate eastern philosophy in them, for example, Mythic Being: Doing Yoga (1975), The Color Wheel Series (2000), and Mokshamudra Progression (2012). On her website, Piper brings attention to the rise of yoga in the United States, and with it, the decline of its true spiritual meanings. She states, "But my deeper hope is that professional philosophers who visit these pages will eventually take it upon themselves to begin the long, slow process of reintegrating the Eastern philosophical tradition with the Western one, of reminding us what we have lost – by restoring the application of theory to practice as a central measure of philosophical worth; by restoring, too, the more generous conception of the self extending beyond the ego that Western philosophy has forgotten; by restoring to a central place in our thinking the insights of Yoga into the structure of the ego and its relation to change, desire, and acquisitions; and thereby restoring the methods, practices and wisdom of Yoga to its rightful place among the many philosophical traditions that express our capacities for intellectual analysis and spiritual growth."

== Career ==
In June 1968 Piper's work was published in 0 to 9 magazine, an avant-garde publication that experimented with language and meaning-making. The first mention of Piper as an artist in the press was in the Village Voice on March 27, 1969, when she was only 19 years old. It was in response to what also is considered her first solo exhibition, her mail art project entitled, Three Untitled Projects. The people and institutions to whom she sent her 8 1/2-by-11-inch (220 mm × 280 mm) stapled booklets that comprised the piece were listed on the last page as the "Exhibit Locations". With this project, Piper succeeded in distributing her work on her own terms to an audience of more than 150 artists, curators, and dealers of her choosing.

=== Street performances (1970s) ===
In the 1970s, she began a series of street performances under the collective title, Catalysis, which included actions such as painting her clothes with white paint, wearing a sign that read "Wet Paint", and going to Macy's department store to shop for gloves and sunglasses; stuffing a huge white towel into her mouth and riding the bus, subway, and Empire State Building elevator; and dousing herself in a mixture of vinegar, eggs, milk, and cod liver oil and then spending a week moving around New York's subway and bookstores. Catalysis VII involved Piper visiting a museum, chewing gum loudly, and holding a purse full of ketchup. The Catalysis performances were meant to catalyze challenges that constituted the order of the social field, "at the level of dress, sanity, and the distinction between public and private acts." day. The word "catalysis" describes a chemical reaction caused by a catalytic agent that remains unchanged, and Piper viewed her audience's reaction as the unaffected agent.

Piper's Mythic Being series, started in 1973, saw the artist dressed in a wig and mustache and performing publicly as a "third world, working class, overly hostile male."

In 2013, NYU's Grey Art Gallery played footage from Piper's 1973 work, Mythic Being, in its exhibition entitled, "Radical Presence: Black Performance in Contemporary Art". Piper rejected the inclusion, and requested that her work be removed from the exhibition because its inclusion further underlined the marginalization of non-White artists and was in direct opposition to the ideals that she fought to inspire in her viewers.

Piper spent the summer of 1971 in her loft in New York City. During this time, she was reading Immanuel Kant's Critique of Pure Reason (1781). She would read this book while doing various activities. Such activities consisted of yoga, fasting and writing. However, her experience reading this led to her feeling that she was losing connection to her physical self and was disappearing. She created the work Food for the Spirit to counteract this feeling. To perform the work, she would photograph herself periodically in front of a mirror and would chant parts of the book that led her to this feeling. The works consist of 14 gelatin silver prints as part of a binder.

=== Funk Lessons (1980s) ===
Between 1982 and 1984, Piper staged a series of events advertised as Funk Lessons, which invited participants to learn about the dance styles, culture, and history of funk music. Piper located the roots of funk in African tribal music and saw it as integral to the growing presence of black cultural figures in America and the ongoing struggle for equal rights. By exposing diverse audiences to the music of African American counterculture, Piper sought to create a dialogue about the cultural value of dance music and the politics of race and identity.

Each "lesson" was advertised on postcards that specifically avoided labeling the event as a work of participatory art. Piper began the lessons by playing samples of music and instructing participants in specific dance moves, while gradually introducing anecdotes of black history and culture into her presentation. Piper acted as a facilitator to discussions that, at times, grew heated as participants strayed from the academic format to engage in active discussion. By engaging audiences in active participation, Piper saw herself as creating an early work of relational aesthetics or what might be described as social practice. As documented in a video by Sam Samore, the experience transcended academic didacticism in favor of social exchange; Piper's mantra for the work was, "Get down and party together."

=== Adrian Moves to Berlin (2007) ===
In Adrian Moves to Berlin, Piper dances to house music in Alexanderplatz. Frieze, who named the work No.10 of "The 25 Best Works of the 21st Century", stated that "It’s a piece about self-determination, the terrible power of spectatorship, the mystery of historical consciousness. Most of all, it’s about letting go."

=== Scholarship ===
In 1981, Piper published the essay, "Ideology, Confrontation, and Political Self Awareness", in High Performance Magazine. In it, she details three pervasive logical fallacies that she felt contributed to constructing one's ideology: the False Identity Mechanism, Illusion of Perfectibility, and One Way Communication Mechanism. She argued that these fallacies lead to the Illusion of Omniscience, which she defined as "[b]eing so convinced of the infallibility of your own beliefs about everyone else that you forget you are perceiving and experiencing as other people from a perspective that is in its own ways just as subjective and limited as theirs."

In 2008, she published her two-volume essay, "Rationality and the Structure of the Self". Volume I involves a summary of a wealth of Western philosophy, while Volume II focuses on her own interpretation of these philosophers. In Volume II, Piper argues that, without moral alienation, we would be unable to forge relationships with others, or act interpersonally in the service of selfless or disinterested moral principles.

=== Gallery work ===
Much of Piper's work deals with issues of racial passing, racism, and gender in the United States. For example, in her 1986 performance piece, "My Calling (Card) #1", she distributed a card to anyone who made a racist comment in her presence, making them aware of her identity as an African American woman, and of how their comment made her feel uncomfortable. These cards were distributed by Piper at dinners and cocktail parties as a way for her to subtly confront racism. In an effort to challenge gender norms, Piper explored the negative associations made about a woman sitting alone at a bar and the assumption that she is seeking the male gaze. To combat these norms between 1986 and 1990 she would pass out "My Calling Card #2" to request onlookers respect her privacy and to convey that being alone does not equate to her intending to be picked up. Both of these Calling Cards were handed out to make a statement about her identity.

Racial passing is addressed in another of Piper's performance pieces, "Cornered" (1988), where in a video recording she declares to an audience, "I'm black". Piper then explains how that fact may surprise the viewer because Piper, who has a fairer complexion, could pass for White, but chooses to identify as black.

Piper's, Everything #5.2 (2004), is a piece of mirrored glass shaped like a tombstone that layers the reflection of the viewer, the text, "Everything Will Be Taken Away", and the internal structures behind the plaster of the gallery wall. The work can be seen as a means of provoking viewers to interrogate the power of institutions to determine the value of a piece of art, as well as to interrogate their own place in the world.

In The Probable Trust Registry, the piece for which Piper received top honors at the Venice Biennale in 2015, Piper asked visitors to sign contracts with themselves adhering to one of a trio of posted statements, for example, "I will always do what I say I am going to do". In a statement accompanying the award, the jury said: "Piper has reformed conceptual practice to include personal subjectivity—of herself, her audience, and the public in general." They also noted that the piece asks its audience "to engage in a lifelong performance of personal responsibility." In February 2017, the work was central to her first solo exhibition in a German museum at Nationalgalerie at Hamburger Bahnhof.

A 50-year retrospective of Piper's work, displayed on the top floor of the Museum of Modern Art (MoMA) from March 31, 2018, to July 22, 2018, is the first time the New York museum devoted that entire level to a living artist.

Selected images

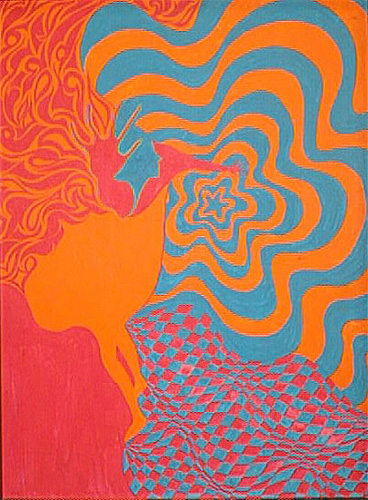
Alice Down the Rabbit Hole (1965)

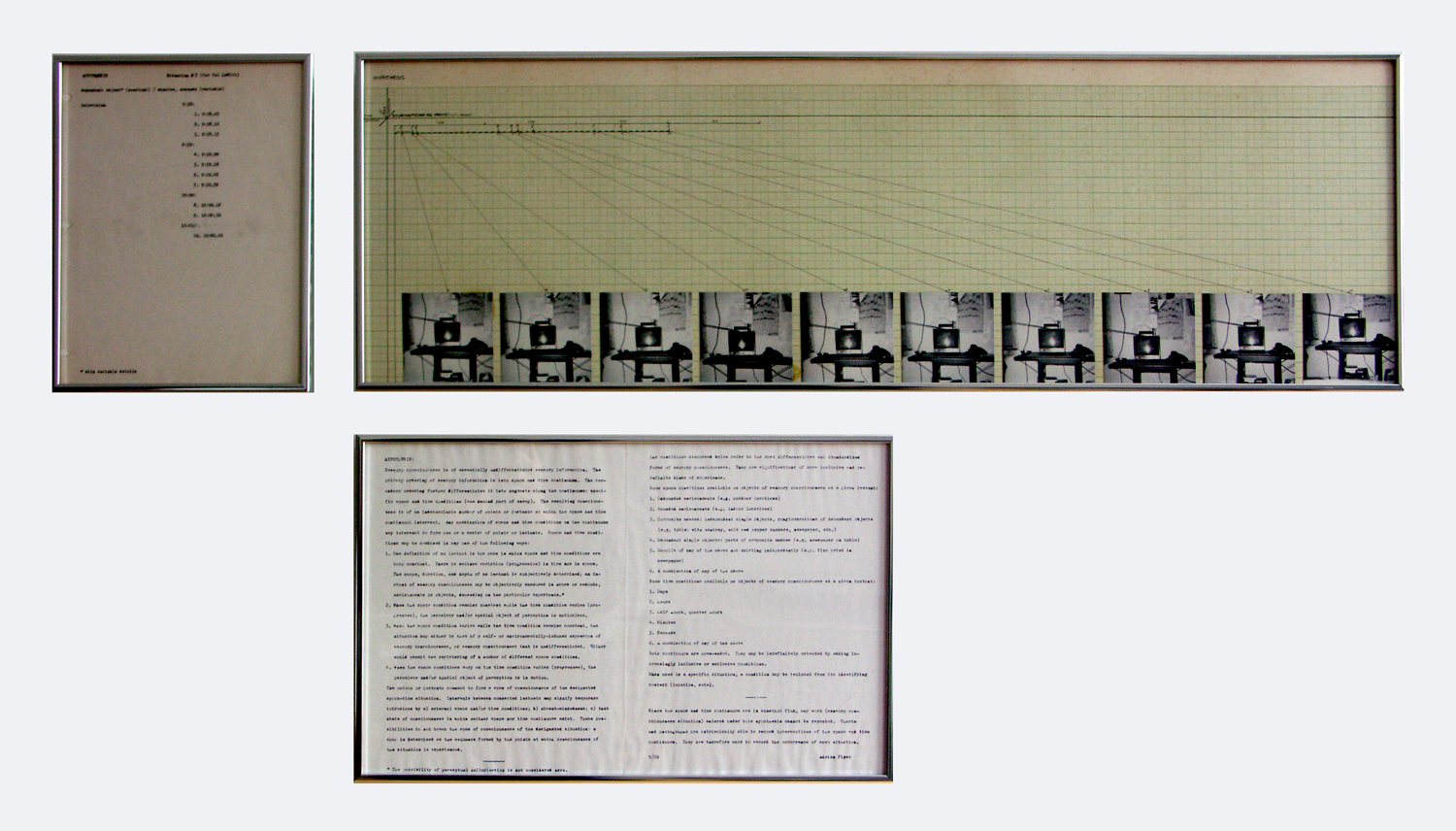
Hypothesis: Situation #3 (for Sol LeWitt) (1968)

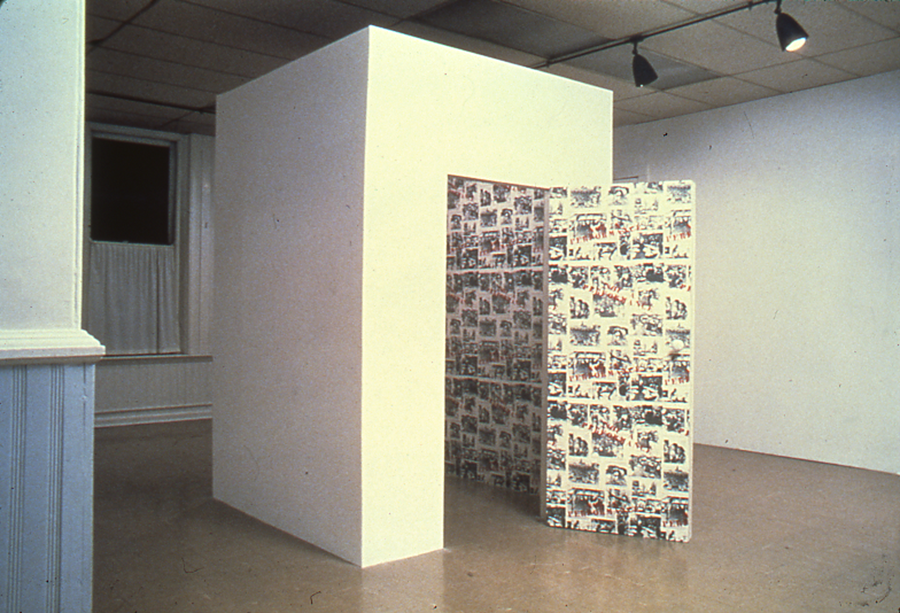
Art for the Artworld Surface Pattern (1976)

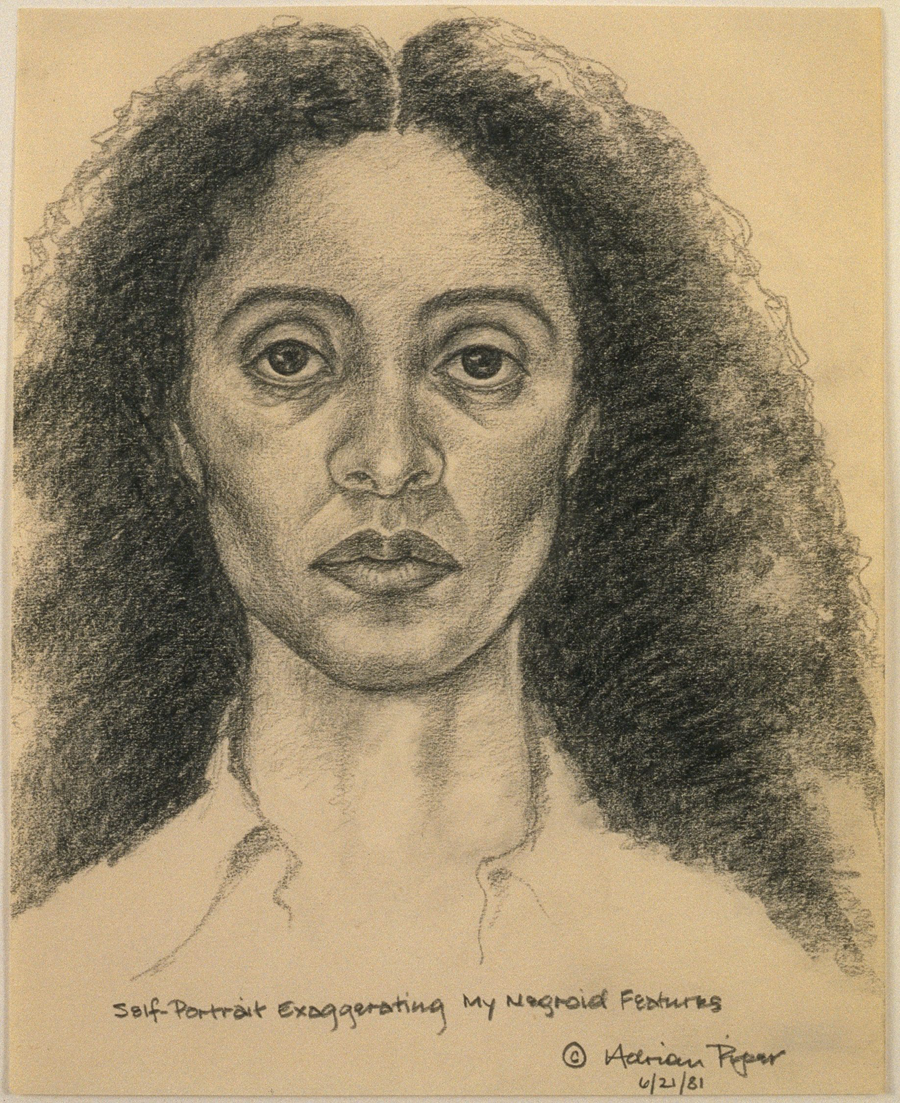
Self-Portrait Exaggerating My Negroid Features (1981)

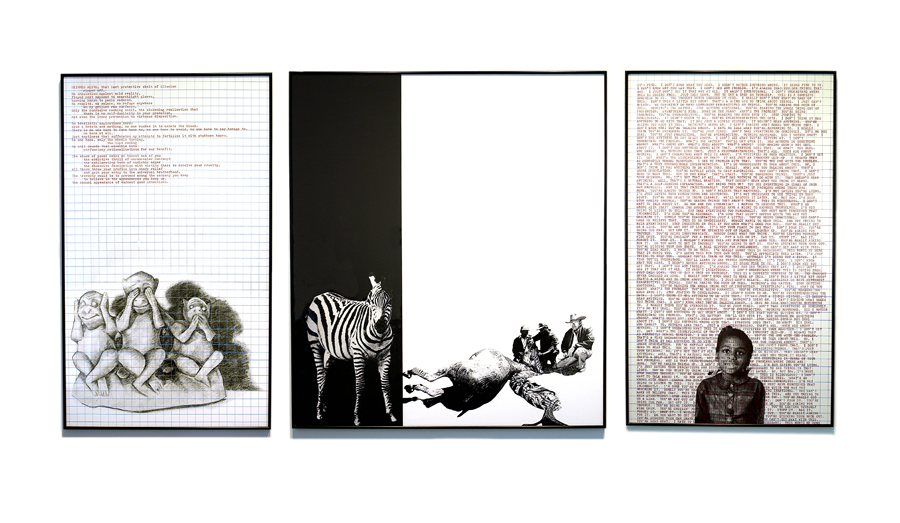
Decide Who You Are, #1: Skinned Alive (1991)

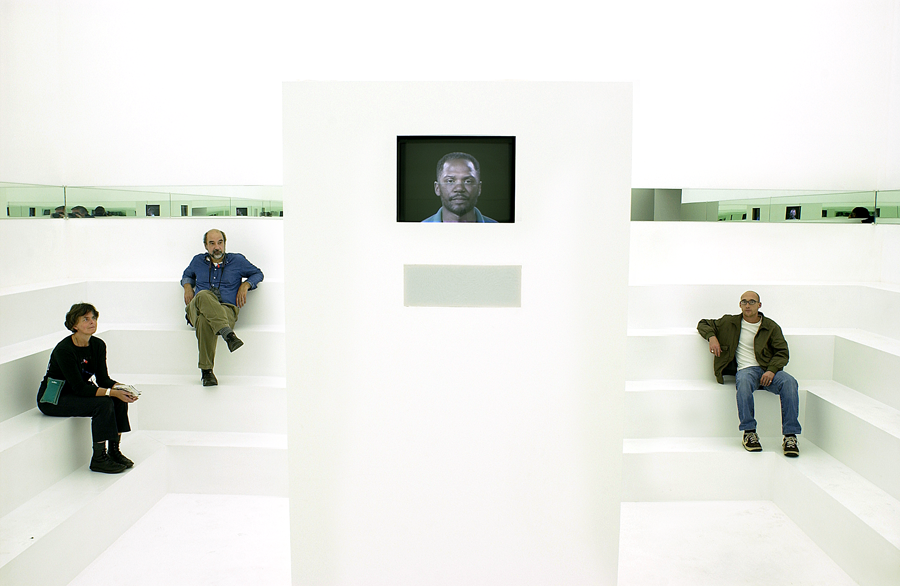
What It's Like, What It Is #3 (1991)

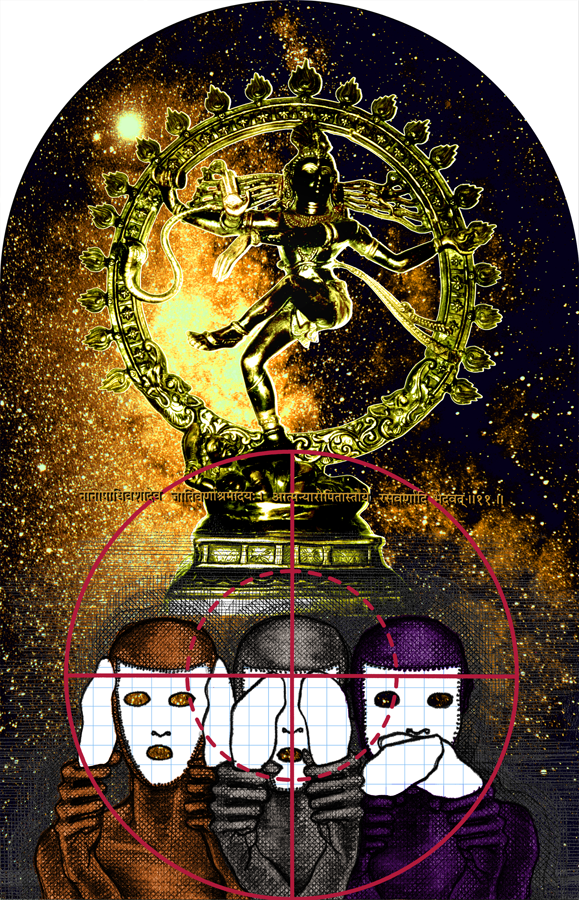
The Color Wheel Series, #29: Annomayakosha (2000)

== Foundation ==
The Adrian Piper Research Archive Foundation

The Adrian Piper Research Archive Foundation is based in Berlin, Germany. It focuses on documenting the art, philosophy, and yoga of Piper's life. The goal of the foundation is to protect, preserve, and offer public access to the foundation for the benefit of those students, scholars, curators, collectors, writers, and members of the general public who demonstrate interest in the work of Piper. A fellowship award has been given in the years 2011, 2013, 2015, and 2017, with the amount of the award varying. The foundation is raising funds with the goals of, (1) complete the renovation of its permanent home in Berlin-Mitte so as to increase its accessibility to the general public; (2) increase the grant amount of the annual Multi-disciplinary Fellowship to a full-year research sabbatical for the grantee; and (3) lay the foundations for the a new Philosophy Dissertation Fellowship for the foundation. The goal of the campaign is to raise €4,000,000.

The Berlin Journal of Philosophy

Established in 2011, The Berlin Journal of Philosophy is an open-access, peer-reviewed, international journal that seeks to innovate through adhering strictly to simultaneous policies of blind submission, double-blind review, and anti-plagiarism. The Berlin Journal of Philosophy is administered and published by the APRA Foundation Berlin.

== Collections ==
- Art Institute of Chicago, Chicago, IL
- Metropolitan Museum of Art, New York
- Museum of Modern Art, New York
- National Gallery of Art, Washington, DC
- Walker Art Center, Minneapolis, MN

== Reception ==
Curator Ned Rifkin wrote that Piper "holds a singular position" in the art world. Art critic Michael Brenson asserted that Piper's work "cut through the frozen sea in people and [led] them into areas of themselves they did not know existed." Piper was included in Peggy Phelan and Helena Reckitt's compendium, Art and Feminism (2001), where Phelan wrote that her art "worked to show the ways in which racism and sexism are intertwined pathologies which have distorted our lives."

Piper received visual arts fellowships from the National Endowment for the Arts in 1979 and 1982, and a Guggenheim Fellowship in 1989. In 1987, she became the first female African-American philosophy professor to receive academic tenure in the United States. In 2012, she received the Artist Award for Distinguished Body of Work from the College Art Association. In 2015, she was awarded the Golden Lion for best artist of the 2015 Venice Biennale for her participation in Okwui Enwezor's central show, "All the World's Futures".

In 2011 the American Philosophical Association awarded her the title, professor emeritus. In 2013, the Women's Caucus for Art announced that Piper would be a 2014 recipient of the organization's Lifetime Achievement Award.

Piper received the Käthe-Kollwitz-Preis 2018 of the Akademie der Künste, an award that goes to an artist working on an international level and analytical philosopher, who has had a considerable influence on American conceptual art since the mid-1960s.

Piper's work was included in the 2025 exhibition Photography and the Black Arts Movement, 1955–1985 at the National Gallery of Art.

== See also ==
- Rose Piper
