= Rodney Carswell =

American painter

- Born: 1946 (age 79–80); Carmel, California, US
- Education: University of New Mexico, University of Colorado Boulder
- Known for: Painting, educator
- Style: Abstract
- Movement: Postminimalist
- Spouse: Renee (DuBois) Carswell

Rodney Carswell (born 1946) is an American abstract artist. He first gained recognition for human-scaled, geometric paintings that feature exposed, projected support structures, creating interplay between sculptural presence and richly painted pictorial surfaces. His recent paintings eschew the superstructures and evoke a greater sense of immediacy, playfulness, and narrative. Critics often describe Carswell's work as uncanny, elusive or quirky, for its tendency to negotiate "in-between" spaces and embrace contradictions such as order and instability, intention and accident, or back and front. Employing irregularly shaped canvasses, thick supports, and openings or holes that reveal the stretcher construction and walls behind them, works like 3 (In 4) (1994) often occupy a place between painting and sculpture. In a similar way, Carswell uses the modernist languages of Minimalism, Suprematism and Constructivism, yet eludes those categories with postmodern allusions to architecture, the body and spiritual iconography, and with his process-oriented, "hand-made" surfaces. In his essay for Carswell's mid-career retrospective at Chicago's Renaissance Society, Los Angeles Times critic David Pagel suggested that his understated paintings worked their way into one's consciousness in a "supple, somewhat unsettling manner" that achieves a subtle, but lingering shift in perception.

Rodney Carswell, 3 (In 4), oil, wax, canvas, wood, 72" x 72" x 4.5", 1994.

Carswell has been featured in additional solo exhibitions at the University of Oklahoma Museum of Art and Miami University Museum of Art, as well as in key surveys at the Albright-Knox Art Gallery, Corcoran Gallery of Art, and Museum of Contemporary Art, Chicago (MCA). His work has been widely covered in art magazines such as Artforum, Art in America, ARTnews, and the New Art Examiner, and major publications including the New York Times and Chicago Tribune. He has been recognized with fellowships from the John S. Guggenheim and Louis Comfort Tiffany foundations and the National Endowment for the Arts. In addition to his art practice, Carswell has taught and lectured on art and opened and operated a successful restaurant in Chicago.

== Life and career ==
Rodney Carswell was born in Carmel, California in 1946 and raised in Santa Fe, New Mexico. After completing high school at the New Mexico Military Institute in Roswell, he studied art at the University of New Mexico (UNM) with professors John Pearson, Van Deren Coke and Garo Antresian, earning a BFA in 1968. After graduating, Carswell married Renee Dubois, traveled in Europe, and then enrolled in the MFA program at the University of Colorado Boulder, where he worked with professors George Woodman and Roland Reiss, and received an MFA in 1972.

Following graduate study, Carswell began teaching at Illinois State University (1972–1980) and exhibiting throughout the Midwest. He was selected for the Art Institute of Chicago's prestigious "Chicago and Vicinity" show in 1973 and later picked up by Roy Boyd Gallery. In 1980, the Carswells moved to New York City, where they worked various blue-collar jobs and Renee gave birth to their daughter, Calida, in 1983. Later that year, they returned to the Midwest when he secured a position at the University of Illinois at Chicago, where he would teach art and serve in several administrative capacities, until retiring in 2007.

Throughout this period, Carswell showed regularly, at galleries including Roy Boyd (Chicago and Los Angeles), Linda Durham (New Mexico), Feigen, Thomas McCormick, and Devening Projects (all three Chicago). His work was featured in museums throughout the United States, including these major shows: Corcoran Gallery 44th Biennial, "Painting Outside of Painting" (1995); MCA Chicago, "Art in Chicago 1945-95" (1996); and Terra Museum, "Surfaces: Two Decades of Chicago Painting" (1987).

In 1998, the Carswells opened a Latino-flavored restaurant in his former studio space, called Flo, that they operated until late 2011, when Carswell returned to his roots in New Mexico. He was a resident at the Roswell Artist in Residence Program (2011–12), before moving back to Santa Fe, where he currently lives and works.

== Work ==
Largely emerging in a period in which it was commonly held that "painting was dead," Carswell's body of work has been deemed noteworthy for his "unwavering belief in art as an act of individual scrutiny and contemplation," "remarkable consistency of purpose," and "relentless pursuit of subtle variation."

Rodney Carswell, Martha, acrylic and rhoplex on canvas, 65" x 68", 1977.

Carswell has said that "reductive abstraction" has been integral to his work dating back to his art education in the late 1960s, when iconic minimalists such as Frank Stella, Donald Judd and Robert Ryman were at their most influential. Ultimately, he felt a greater kinship with artists identified as post-minimalists, such as Eva Hesse, Jackie Winsor, Nancy Graves and Joel Shapiro, preferring their idiosyncratic styles of abstraction and engagement with the body, the hand-crafted and process over minimalism's embrace of non-referentiality and the mechanical. In interviews, Carswell has said he was "trying to get the human element more in evidence" and making "visible the way an artist—myself, in this case—has behaved toward the object. The idea is to have the nature of the material and the act performed on the material both be evident in the object that results."

In his early work, this often took the form of what some critics called "irreverent constructions," such as Martha (1977): painted fields of unstretched canvas that Carswell cut into geometric sail-like forms and attached directly to walls. Although abstract, these works were intended in their scale and positioning close to the floor to suggest a figural presence or "echo" of the viewer. Carswell also engaged the paintings as objects, in terms of their unconventional shapes and thin, minimal presence without stretcher bars. By the late 1970s, influenced by the work of Ron Gorchov, he decided to explore this issue in a more robust way, leading to a breakthrough in his work.

Rodney Carswell, Black and White Cross Encircled by Red, oil, wax, canvas, wood, 42" x 49" x 3.5", 1988.

=== Mature work ===
Carswell began constructing visible support armatures that jutted into three-dimensional space, giving paintings like St. Tropez (1978) a commanding sculptural presence. In New York, he continued to develop these structures while also shifting to a thicker, built-up and scraped-down surface application of oil paint and wax (encaustic). By the late-1980s, he achieved his mature style in works like Black and White Cross Encircled by Red (1988), employing a spare lexicon of emblematic forms (crosses, semicircles, squares, rectangles), thick exposed supports, interlocking planes and shaped or assembled canvasses, that he painted in vivid, unmodulated colors with rich, layered surfaces. His formal experimentation would include geometric openings or holes that pierced the canvasses—"diagramming" paintings by revealing their construction and relationship with the walls behind them as he did in Two Grays and Orange Around an Empty Rectangle (1988)—or displaying both backs and fronts of painted panels, as in 3 (5) Panels, Presented and Reversed (1993). Carswell described these works as "integrated pictorial objects [...] at once physical and logical, ephemeral and phenomenal."

Critics, such as Judith Russi Kirshner, have frequently commented on this sense of in-between spaces and paradoxes in Carswell's work of this period, for example, calling it "an ambiguous balance of object and image," or in curator Terrie Sultan's case, identifying a "call-and-response" between accidental painted effects and deliberate, geometric compositional strategies. Others noted the push-and-pull between the arresting, unitary gestalt of iconic geometry and the seductive, almost decorative surfaces. Artforum's James Yood suggested that Carswell's "wry sequences of subtle dislocation" skewed his geometric abstract language just enough to keep his compositions "tense and expectant." David Pagel concluded that Carswell's "randomly off-balanced and rigorously geometric" configurations were profoundly resistant to rational explanation, calling them "tight organizations that defy logic yet make sense."

Rodney Carswell, Jan 19 (09), oil on canvas, 32" x 27", 2009.

Critic Craig Adcock attributed a sense of "contingency and irresolution" in Carswell's work in his postmodernist recombining of Suprematist and Constructivist vocabularies, which allowed for complex allusions to familiar corporeal and architectural issues, as well as to art historical references, such as da Vinci's Vitruvian Man. He identified in the work "a search for essences" he found as much mathematical as allegorical. Buzz Spector noted allusions to "the spiritual geometries" of icons or the retablos of Carswell's native American Southwest, creating a "dialogue between spirituality and pragmatism" that seemed to quest for meaning while also demonstrating a formal—but not ironic—skepticism of modernist utopias and traditional spirituality.

Rodney Carswell, Untitled (February 12), india ink and gouache on Arches paper, 40" x 35", 2018.

In his post-2002 paintings, Carswell has sought a greater sense of immediacy, leaving behind the superstructures and scale of past works and taking a speculative and exploratory approach to "incorporate more surprise and imaginative play." Although still abstract, image and representation have become more apparent, and works like Jan 19 (09) (2009) have become less geometric and more expressive in terms of gesture, modulation, and color. Compositional elements and surface details—pencil lines beneath transparent layers of paint, abandoned stray marks, or edges of color planes peeking out—work like terms in language, cohering with a unique syntax to suggest problems, subjective and idiosyncratic solutions, or narratives that reveal Carswell's hand and mind at work. More recently, Carswell has been creating lithographs and larger gouache and india ink works on paper in a similar vein.

== Teaching ==
Carswell taught for over thirty years, beginning in 1972 as an assistant professor at Illinois State University (ISU) in Normal, Illinois. He worked there alongside colleagues such as Ken Holder, Harold Gregor and Ron Jackson, earning tenure in 1979, before leaving the next year for New York City. After the birth of his daughter Calida, in 1983, Carswell returned to teaching at the School of Art and Design at the University of Illinois at Chicago (UIC). At UIC, he joined an ambitious studio arts faculty that included Martin Puryear, Charles Wilson, Julia Fish, Tony Tasset, and Phyllis Bramson. In addition to serving as Assistant Professor (1983–90), Associate Professor (1990–6), and Professor (1996–2007), he was the school's Director of Graduate Studies (1994–6) and Acting Director (1996, 1997–9). Carswell retired as Professor Emeritus from UIC in 2007.

== Flo ==
Carswell comes from the family that opened the well-known Santa Fe restaurant, The Shed, in 1953. In 1998, he and his wife Renee opened a Latino-flavored restaurant in his former studio space on West Chicago Avenue called Flo, pioneering the underserved, pre-development Noble Square neighborhood just northwest of Chicago's downtown. The restaurant was known for its eclectic menu, diverse intellectual community, and notable art. They operated the restaurant—which has remained in business since—until late 2011, when Carswell moved back to his native New Mexico.

== Recognition and collections ==
Carswell has been recognized with fellowships from the John S. Guggenheim Foundation (1989), Louis Comfort Tiffany Foundation (1993), National Endowment for the Arts (1991), Arts Midwest/National Endowment for the Arts (1998), and Illinois Arts Council (1985), as well as with awards from the Art Institute of Chicago (Viehler Award, 1973; and Pauline Palmer Prize, 1990) and a Roswell Artist-in-Residence Grant.

His work has been purchased by numerous private art collections and public collections including those of the: Art Institute of Chicago, Albright-Knox Art Gallery, John D. and Catherine T. MacArthur Foundation, Roswell Museum and Art Center, Fred Jones Jr. Museum of Art (University of Oklahoma), Allen Memorial Art Museum (Oberlin College), Illinois State Museum, University of New Mexico Art Museum, Miami University Art Museum, Evansville Museum of Arts, History and Science, Arkansas Art Center, Art Museum of West Virginia University, Mulvane Art Museum, and DePaul Art Museum.
