= Shankar Tucker =

American clarinetist and music composer (born 1987)

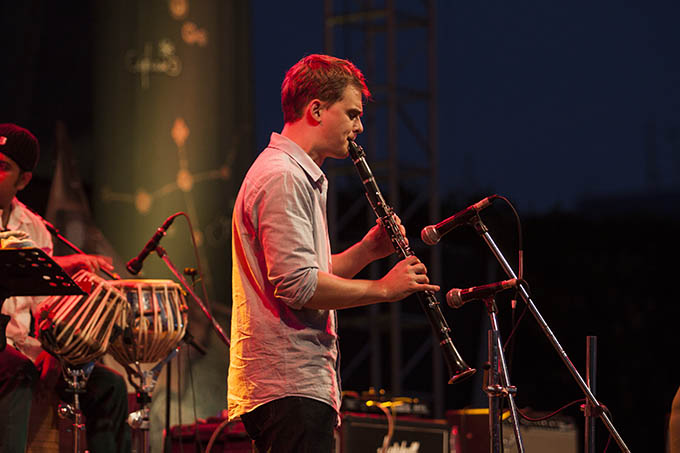
- Shankar Tucker at NH7 Weekender 2013

Background information
- Born: Ambrose Avril Tucker; July 31, 1987 (age 39); Massachusetts
- Origin: Boston, Massachusetts
- Genres: Hindustani Classical, Indian Fusion, Alternative, Jazz, World
- Occupations: Composer, Clarinetist
- Instruments: Clarinet, Piano, Tabla, Kanjira, Guitar
- Years active: 2011-present
- Website: shankartucker.com

Shankar Tucker is an American clarinetist and music composer. He rose to fame with the popularity of his YouTube music channel "The ShrutiBox".

== Early life and education ==
He was born as Ambrose Tucker to sculptor William G. Tucker, and his artist wife, Kamini Avril. He grew up in Ashfield, Massachusetts. He has a younger sister, Akshaya Avril Tucker (born 1992), a cellist and a trained Indian Classical dancer, who has collaborated with him on his compositions. Shankar was the name given to him as a young child by “Amma” – the spiritual leader and renowned humanitarian Mata Amritanandamayi (his family are devotees) on her US tour, and he has gone by it ever since.

When he was young, he wanted to play the saxophone, but since his grandfather could teach him, his parents pushed him toward clarinet. He started to learn classical clarinet at age 10. He attended the Pioneer Valley Performing Arts Charter Public School. At 15, he discovered his fascination for Indian classical music when he first heard Remember Shakti (album), by John McLaughlin, Zakir Hussain, Vikku Vinayakram and Hariprasad Chaurasia.

He earned a scholarship to the New England Conservatory of Music in 2006 from an appearance on From the Top, the nationally syndicated youth radio show. He became deeply interested in improvisation, both in jazz and classical Indian music, while he continued to study and perform Western classical music at such venues as Symphony Hall, Boston and Jordan Hall. At the Conservatory he studied with Tom Martin of the Boston Symphony Orchestra, while the sitar player Peter Row taught him the fundamentals of Indian classical performance. On graduating from the Conservatory in 2010 as a Bachelor of Clarinet Classical Performance, Classical Music, he was awarded a grant by the Frank Huntingdon Beebe Fund to pursue his ambition to adapt the clarinet to Indian classical performance. He was accepted as a student by the world-famous Hindustani flute player Hariprasad Chaurasia at his Vrindaban Gurukul in Mumbai in the summer of 2010.

== Career ==
Shankar Tucker's original music blends the sounds of Indian Classical music, Jazz, and popular music to create a seamless synthesis of cultures and traditions.

Shankar has toured with Mata Amritanandamayi, performing with her bhajan ensemble in 12 major cities across the US, including Seattle, Los Angeles, San Francisco, Dallas, Chicago, Washington, D.C., Boston, Toronto, and New York City. While on tour with Amma, he had the opportunity to perform with David Balakrishnan of the Turtle Island String Quartet and study with saxophonist George Brooks. Shankar recorded an album of his fusion compositions entitled Uplift, which was premiered on Amma's 2009 US tour. Through benefit concerts and sales of the CD, he raised several thousand dollars, which was put towards a charity helping farmers in Southern India.

As a clarinetist, Tucker has shared the stage with such legendary artists as Zakir Hussain, Hariprasad Chaurasia, and Raghu Dixit and recorded with music director Amit Trivedi for Coke Studio (India) . His ensemble has had the distinction of performing at the White House Diwali function of 2012, hosted by Vice President Joe Biden. He was invited to play at the first Indo American Inaugural Ball hosted by the Indian Americans on January 20, 2013 in Washington, D.C., along with a group of singers that included Vidya & Vandana (the Iyer sisters) and Rohan Kymal.

He was featured in articles in The Indian Express, Hindustan Times, and The Hindu.

His debut album Filament was released on July 28, 2015.

== The ShrutiBox ==
The ShrutiBox is the title of an ongoing series (started in 2011) of internet music videos composed, recorded, performed and directed by Tucker. The videos have created great excitement, garnering over 30 million views and a combined 154,563 fans. The series has been featured on the front page of YouTube, MTV India, and has recently been included in the Smithsonian Museum’s exhibition on Indian American Culture.

Tucker blends Classical Indian music, jazz and popular music to create an original fusion sound, both in solo recordings and with some of the most talented and accomplished young Carnatic and Hindustani vocalists and instrumentalists, including Vidya and Vandana Iyer, Jomy George, Nirali Kartik, Mahesh Vinayakram, B. Sree Sundarkumar, and others. Tucker himself plays a wide range of instruments in his recordings: piano, bass, kanjira, tabla, and other percussion instruments. The videos feature his own compositions, and his arrangements of traditional and classical songs, film and popular music, in Hindi, Tamil and English.

In 2014, Vidya Iyer and he co-founded the ShrutiBox Music, Inc.

== Popularity ==
Shankar Tucker was an invited speaker at TEDxGateway conference in Mumbai and TEDxCEG in Chennai. On June 9, 2013, he started a new project on Kickstarter, 'Shankar's New Album and Video Series', to fund his upcoming tours and the album, Filament. The target was to pledge $20,000 before August 1, 2013, but due to his huge fan following, $34,055 was pledged in just 6 days.
