= Food for the Spirit =

1971 performance art piece by Adrian Piper

- One of the fourteen photographs
- Artist: Adrian Piper
- Year: 1971
- Type: Performance art, self-portrait
- Medium: Gelatin silver print

Food for the Spirit (1971) is a performance art piece and self-portrait series by American conceptual artist Adrian Piper, which was conducted, performed and documented in the summer of 1971 in her New York loft as she isolated herself and entered a dissociative phase influenced by her constant reading of Immanuel Kant's Critique of Pure Reason.

== Outline ==
Piper had begun Food for the Spirit out of a temporary isolated lifestyle that she took upon in her New York loft, including doing yoga, reading, writing, and fasting. However, most integral to the piece was Immanuel Kant's metaphysical work, the Critique of Pure Reason, which she became so intensely engaged with that, by her intention, she began to disassociate and question her material existence. Around the end of this period, where she started to lose all sense of being, intentionally strictly influenced by Kant's perspective on Being and obsessed with Kantian thought, she finalized the piece by ritualistically taking photographs of herself in the mirror, undressed in various ways, as she chanted key phrases from Kant's text that made her feel existentially questioned. Food for the Spirit is an essential piece of artwork in the contribution to the development of conceptual art.

"I rigged up a camera and tape recorder next to [a] mirror, so that every time the fear of losing myself overtook me and drove me to the 'reality check' of the mirror, I was able to both record my physical appearance objectively and also record myself on tape repeating the passage in Critique that was currently driving me to self-transcendence."
