= James Dashow =

American composer

James Dashow (born November 7, 1944, in Chicago, Illinois) is an American composer of electro-acoustic music, instrumental music and opera.

== Life and career ==
Dashow was born in 1944, outside of Chicago. His musical studies began in high school with Horace Reisberg; his principal teachers at the university level were J. K. Randall, Arthur Berger and Seymour Shifrin. In 1969, Dashow went to Italy on a Fulbright Fellowship to complete his studies with Goffredo Petrassi. For many years, he studied the music of Luigi Dallapiccola independently.

One of the first to compose music for digital audio synthesis ("computer music"), Dashow was invited by Graziano (Giuliano) Tisato to work at the computer center of the University of Padua, where he created the first computer music compositions in Italy. He was the first vice president of the International Computer Music Association, has taught at MIT and Princeton University, and continues to actively hold master classes, lectures and concerts in Europe and North America. In 2003 he was composer-in-residence at the 12th Annual Florida Electroacoustic Music Festival in Gainesville, Florida.

For several years he and Riccardo Bianchini coproduced a weekly contemporary music program for RAI. He is the author of the MUSIC30 language for digital sound synthesis, and invented the Dyad System, a method that both integrates pitch structure based on dyads into electronic sounds as well as develops the pitch structure itself in terms of dyadic elaborations.

Following on his extensive use of audio spatialization as an integral part of the compositional process, Dashow composed the first opera designed to be performed in a planetarium (Archimedes), taking advantage of the depth projection capabilities of the digital planetarium projectors and the multichannel audio systems that together provide a full immersion theatrical experience. He continues to develop the idea of a double approach to spatialization, through the complementary concepts of movement in space, and movement of space.

His most important recognitions include the Prix Magistere at Bourges in 2000, Guggenheim (1989) and Koussevitzky Foundation (1998) grants, and in 2011 the Fondazione CEMAT distinguished career award Il CEMAT per la Musica in recognition of his outstanding contributions to electro-acoustic music.

== Principal compositions ==
- Soundings in Pure Duration n.10 (2020) octophonic concrete and electronic sounds
- iPiece (2018–2019) a musical satire for guitar, octophonic electronic sounds, video and some electronic gadgets
- Soundings in Pure Duration n.9 (2016–2017) for bass flute and octophonic concrète and electronic sounds
- Soundings in Pure Duration n.8 (2015–2016) for bass-baritone voice and octophonic concrète and electronic sounds
- Soundings in Pure Duration n.7 (2014) for alto saxophone and octophonic electronic sounds
- Soundings in Pure Duration n.6 (2014) octophonic electronic sounds
- Soundings in Pure Duration n.5 (2012) harp and octophonic electronic sounds
- Soundings in Pure Duration n.4 (2012) viola and octophonic electronic sounds
- Soundings in Pure Duration n.3 (2011) guitar and hexaphonic electronic sounds
- Album of Small Forms vol. 1 (2010) violin, clarinet, piano
- Soundings in Pure Duration n. 2a (2009) pre-recorded percussive and hexaphonic electronic sounds
- Archimedes, a planetarium opera (1999–2008) libretto by Cary Plotkin and Theodore Weiss based on a conception of the composer
- Sul Filo dei Tramonti (2004) version for flute, harp and stereophonic electronic sounds
- Soundings in Pure Duration n.1 (2003) hexaphonic electronic sounds
- Messages from Ortigia (2002) bass flute (alto), bass clarinet, viola, harp and hexaphonic electronic sounds
- Sul Filo dei Tramonti (2000) soprano, piano and stereophonic electronic sounds on poetry by Giangiacomo Menon
- ...at other times, the distances (1999) quadraphonic electronic sounds
- Far Sounds, Broken Cries (1998) 13 instruments and quadraphonic electronic sounds
- Media Survival Kit (1996) a lyric satire for radio broadcast, text by Bruno Ballardini
- First Tangent to the Given Curve (1995–1996) piano and stereophonic electronic sounds
- Le Tracce di Kronos, i Passi (1997) clarinet, dancer and stereophonic electronic sounds
- A Sheaf of Times (1992–1994) flute (alto, piccolo) clarinet (b. cl.), vln, vc, piano, harp, percussion
- Morfologie (1993) for trumpet player (doubling cornet, flugelhorn) and stereophonic electronic sounds
- Reconstructions (1992) for harp and stereophonic electronic sounds
- 4/3 – trio (1989–90) violin, cello and piano
- Oro, Argento & Legno (1987) for flute (piccolo, alto flute) and quadraphonic electronic sounds
- Songs from a Spiral Tree (1984–1986) for mezzo-soprano, flute (piccolo, alto) and harp, on poems by Theodore Roethke
- In Winter Shine (1983) quadraphonic electronic music
- Mnemonics (1981–1982, rev. 1984) violin and quadraphonic electronic sounds
- Second Voyage (1977–1979) tenor voice with stereophonic electronic sounds, poem "Voyage in the Blue" by John Ashbery
- Effetti Collaterali (1976) clarinet in A and stereophonic electronic sounds
- Whispers Out of Time (1975–1976) stereophonic electronic music
- Some Dream Songs (1974–1975) soprano, violin and piano, poems from The Dream Songs by John Berryman
- Ashbery Setting (1971–1972) soprano, flute and piano, poem "Clepsydra" by John Ashbery
- Timespace Extensions (1969) flute, piano and 2 percussionists
- Songs of Despair (1968) soprano and 11 instruments, poems by E. A. Robinson, A. MacLeish, V. Lindsay, T. S. Eliot

== Bibliography ==
Dashow's writings include:

- "Letter on Spatialization," Computer Music Journal 37, no. 3 (Fall 2013): 4–6.
- "The Dyad System" (Part One), Perspectives of New Music, vol. 37 no. 1, Winter 1999, pp. 39–76.
- "The Dyad System" (Parts Two and Three), Perspectives of New Music, vol. 37 no. 2, Summer 1999, pp. 189–230.
- "MUSIC30 – software synthesis language for the TMS320C30 DSP", Computer Music Journal 19, no. 3 (Fall 1995), 83–85.
- "Looking Into Sequence Symbols", Perspectives of New Music 25, nos. 1 & 2 (Winter and Summer 1987), 108–137.
- "New Approaches to Digital Sound Synthesis and Transformation", Computer Music Journal 10, no. 4 (Winter 1986).
- Roads, Curtis, ed. Composers and the Computer, interview with James Dashow, pp. 27–45, Los Altos, California, William Kaufmann, Inc., 1985.
- "Spectra as Chords", Computer Music Journal 4, no. 1 (Spring 1980): 43–52.
- "Three Methods for the Digital Synthesis of Chordal Structures with Non-Harmonic Partials," Interface 7, 1978: 69–94.

== Awards and recognition ==
- CEMAT per la Musica, outstanding career recognition
- Prix Magistere, Bourges (France)
- Koussevitzky Foundation
- Guggenheim Foundation
- Prague Musica Nova (Czech Republic)
- Ars Elettronica, Linz (Austria)
- Rockefeller Foundation
- American Academy and Institute of Arts and Letters
- U.S. National Endowment for the Arts
- Commissions from Harvard Musical Association, La Biennale di Venezia, Rai Radio 3 (Italian National Radio), Fromm Foundation, various soloists and ensembles.
