= Judith M. Bennett =

American historian

Judith MacKenzie Bennett is an American medievalist. She is a professor emerita of history at the University of Southern California, where she was the John R. Hubbard Chair in British History. Bennett writes and teaches about medieval Europe, specifically focusing on gender, women's history, and rural peasants.

== Career and research ==
Bennett studied at Mount Holyoke College in Massachusetts, before completing an M.A. and Ph.D. in medieval studies at the University of Toronto. She was awarded her doctorate in 1981. She subsequently worked at the University of North Carolina at Chapel Hill from 1981 to 2005, before moving to the University of Southern California.

She has published extensively on the history of late medieval England, particularly on the history of women and feminist approaches to medieval history. She has authored and edited nine books and over 30 articles and chapters on medieval women, women's work, and feminist history, as well as a widely used medieval history text, Medieval Europe: A Short History (McGraw Hill). Her 1996 book Ale, Beer, and Brewsters in England: Women's Work in a Changing World, 1300-1600 is still one of a few to look at the transition of brewing from women to men. In her influential 2006 book, History Matters: Patriarchy and the Challenge of Feminism, Bennett argued for the importance of feminist approaches to history and the role of longue durée perspectives in understanding the 'patriarchal equilibrium' that has defined the history of women's experiences over multiple historical periods. This 'patriarchal equilibrium' is characterised by Bennett as a lack of transformation in women's status in comparison to that of men, despite changes over time.

== See also ==
- List of Guggenheim Fellowships awarded in 1989
- Alewife (trade)
