= Vidya Vox =

American YouTuber and musician

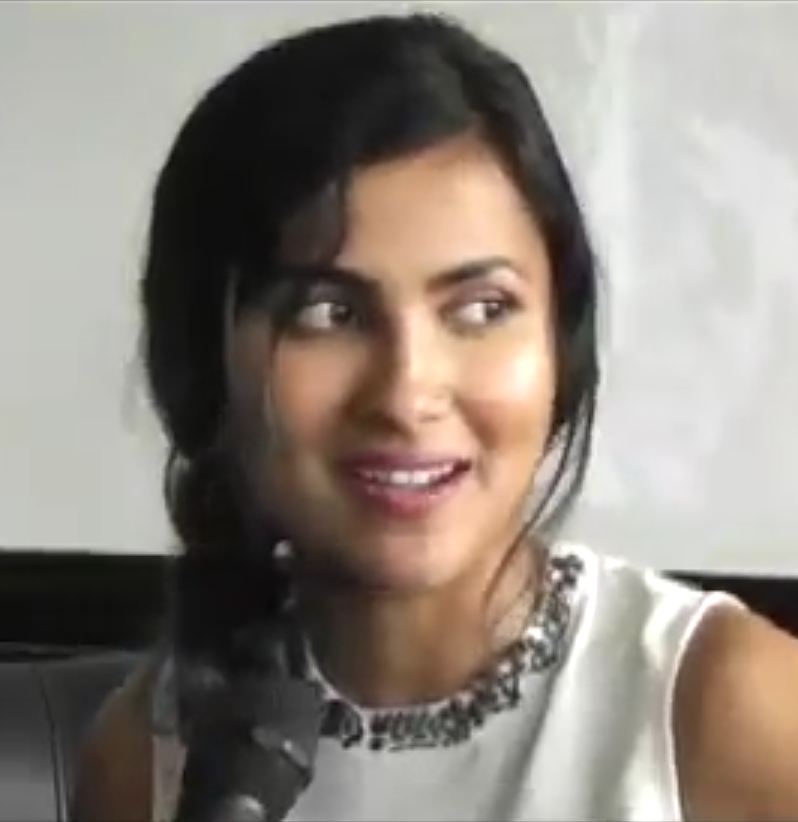
- Born: Vidya Iyer; September 26, 1990 (age 36); Madras, Tamil Nadu, India
- Citizenship: United States
- Occupations: Musician; actress; YouTuber; vlogger; dancer

YouTube information
- Channel: Vidya Vox
- Years active: 2015–present
- Genres: Vlogs; Indian classical music; Carnatic music; classical; rants; western; pop
- Subscribers: 7.61 million
- Views: 1.29 billion
- Last updated: June 11, 2026
- Website: www.vidyavox.com

Vidya Iyer (Tamil pronunciation: [ʋid̪jaː aɪjar]; born September 26, 1990), better known by her stage name Vidya Vox, is an American YouTuber and singer. She was born in Chennai, Tamil Nadu, India and immigrated with her family to the United States at the age of eight. According to NBC News, her music is a mix of "Western pop, electronic dance music, Bollywood hits, and Indian classical music." Since beginning her channel in April 2015, her YouTube channel have received over 1.2 billion views, and her channel has accumulated over 7.5 million subscribers.

== Personal life ==
Iyer was born in a Tamil Iyer family in Madras (now Chennai), Tamil Nadu, India and was raised in Virginia in the United States. Her family is from Palakkad, Kerala, and her mother and grandmother grew up in Kerala. She speaks Tamil at home. She learned Carnatic music from the age of 5 and enjoyed listening to English music. She stated to having an identity crisis, being bullied for being Indian, and hiding her culture while growing up, but has stated she "now feels proud" of her culture.

She was inspired by her grandmother to pursue Indian classical music. She became confident of her Indian roots in college, joined the Indian Student Association, and joined Indian folk dance teams. She studied psychology and biomedical sciences at George Washington University and graduated with a Bachelor of Science degree in biological sciences. She moved to India for two years to learn music.

She collaborated on music with her sister, Vandana Iyer, and her boyfriend, Shankar Tucker, whom she met in college. She participates in bhangra and hip hop dance.

== Career ==
Vidya Vox regularly sings in a band organized by Tucker, along with percussionist Jomy George. She has performed in various locations around the world, including the White House, National Centre for the Performing Arts (India), and Webster Hall. She has performed at Festivals Des Artes on Réunion; for INK Women; in Suriname; in Dubai; and at the Meru Concert Series in the Netherlands.

Her most popular mashup was "Closer / Kabira", a mash up of "Closer" by the Chainsmokers and "Kabira" from the Bollywood film Yeh Jawaani Hai Deewani which clocked in over 55 million views in 7 months. One of her mashups is "Lean On" and "Jind Mahi", for which she had a collaboration with several other musicians, including Ricky Jatt, Raashi Kulkarni, and Roginder "Violinder" Momi. She released "Kuttanadan Punjayile", a Kerala boat song, as a fusion along with an English song written by Tucker and herself, which was shot in Kerala with Mohiniyattam performed by Sreenidhi and Sreedevi. In 2016, she released her EP, Kuthu Fire, which was produced by Shankar Tucker, and co-written by Shankar Tucker and herself.

== Discography ==
=== Original Score ===
Year	Album	Song	Credited as			Co-singer(s)	Notes
Year	Album	Song	Composer	Lyricist	Producer	Co-singer(s)	Notes
2017	Kuthu Fire	"Kuthu Fire"	✗	✓	✗		Co-written, composed and produced by Shankar Tucker
2017	Kuthu Fire	"Diamonds"	✓	✓	✗	Arjun	Co-written, composed and produced by Shankar Tucker
2017	Kuthu Fire	"Diamonds"	✓	✓	✗	Arjun	Co-written by Arjun Coomarsamy
2017	Kuthu Fire	"Be Free" (Pallivaalu Bhadravattakam)	✓	✓	✓	Vandana Iyer	Videography and Editing by Shankar Tucker
2017	Kuthu Fire	"Home"	✗	✓	✗		Co-written, composed, directed and produced by Shankar Tucker
2017	Kuthu Fire	"Show Me Your Light"	✓	✓	✗		Co-written, composed, directed and produced by Shankar Tucker
2017	Kuthu Fire	"Tamil Born Killa"	✗	✓	✗		Co-written, composed, directed and produced by Shankar Tucker
2017	Kuthu Fire	"Tamil Born Killa"	✗	✓	✗		Additionally written by Akshaya Tucker
2018	Minnale		✓	✓	✓		Partnered with Global Desi
2018	Kaadhal Thozhi		✗	✗	✗		Tamil lyrics by Madhan Karky
2018	Kaadhal Thozhi		✗	✗	✗		Co-written, composed, directed and produced by Shankar Tucker
2018	Fly Away		✗	✗	✗	MaatiBaani	Co-written, composed, directed and produced by Shankar Tucker
2018	Fly Away		✗	✗	✗	MaatiBaani	Gujarati lyrics by MaatiBaani
2019	Mad Dreams	"Appadi Poodu Di"	✓	✓	✓		Produced by Shrutibox Music
2019	Mad Dreams	"Mad Dreams"	✓	✓	✓		Co-written by Shankar Tucker, Casey Breves and Sam Tsui
2019	Mad Dreams	"Butterfly"	✓	✓	✓		
2019	Mad Dreams	"Lose the Night"	✓	✓	✓		Produced by Shrutibox Music
2019	Mad Dreams	"Look at the Lights"	✓	✓	✓		Co-written by Shankar Tucker, Mindy Jones
2019	Make a Move		✓	✓	✗		Co-written and Produced by Shankar Tucker
2019	Make a Move		✓	✓	✗		Additionally written by Casey Breves and Sam Tsui
2020	Faded Love		✓	✓	✓	Co-written and performed by Devenderpal Singh	
2020	Thalaivi		✓	✓	✗		Co-written and Produced by Shankar Tucker
2020	Lost in the Summer		✓	✓	✗		Co-written and Produced by Shankar Tucker
2021	Nachle		✓	✓	✗	Trichia Grace-Ann Rebello & Shrey Jadav	Produced by Adil S Aziz
2021	Melt In My Touch		✓	✓	✗		Co-written and Produced by Shankar Tucker
2022	Vanakkam		✓	✓	✓		
2022	Moonlight (Pera Sollu)		✓	✓	✗	Shankar Tucker	Co-written and Produced by Shankar Tucker
2022	Dream Catcher | Tu Paas Aana		✓	✓	✗	Shashwat Singh	Co-written and Produced by Shankar Tucker
2022	Dream Catcher | Tu Paas Aana		✓	✓	✗	Shashwat Singh	Additionally written by Shashwat Singh
2023	Shubha Mangalyam | Made in the Stars		✓	✓	✗		Additionally written by Seetha Jayakumar (Malayalam), Neeraj Pandey (Hindi)
2023	Shubha Mangalyam | Made in the Stars		✓	✓	✗		Co-written and Produced by Shankar Tucker
2024	Sundari	"Stardust"	✓	✓	✗		Produced by Shankar Tucker
2024	Sundari	"Stardust"	✓	✓	✗		Tamil lyrics by Madhan Karky
2024	Sundari	"Sundari"	✓	✓	✗		Tamil lyrics by Madhan Karky
2024	Sundari	"Sundari"	✓	✓	✗		Co-written and produced by Shankar Tucker
2024	Sundari	"Ini Ninte Lokam (Go Off)"	✓	✓	✗		Co-written by Ambrose Tucker and Seetha Jayaraman
2024	Sundari	"Ini Ninte Lokam (Go Off)"	✓	✓	✗		Produced by Shankar Tucker
2024	Sundari	"Dangerous"	✓	✓	✗	Nikhita Gandhi	Produced by Shankar Tucker
2024	Sundari	"Champagne Roses"	✓	✓	✗		Produced by Shankar Tucker
2024	Sundari	"Champagne Roses"	✓	✓	✗		Co-written by Ambrose Tucker
2024	Sundari	"Yazhiha"	✓	✓	✗		Co-written by Rohith Jayaraman, Ambrose Tucker and Madhan Karky
2024	Sundari	"Yazhiha"	✓	✓	✗		Produced by Shankar Tucker

=== As singer ===
Year	Song	Composer	Co-singer(s)	Language	Notes
2024	Kaakarattan	G. V. Prakash Kumar	Rajalakshmi Senthilganesan	Tamil	
2024	One More Time	G. V. Prakash Kumar	G. V. Prakash Kumar	Telugu	Debut in feature films
