= Nelson W. Aldrich Jr. =

American editor and writer (1935–2022)

- Born: Nelson Wilmarth Aldrich Jr. April 11, 1935; Boston, Massachusetts, U.S.
- Died: March 8, 2022 (aged 86); North Stonington, Connecticut, U.S.
- Education: Fay School; St Paul's School; Harvard College

Nelson Wilmarth Aldrich Jr. (April 11, 1935 – March 8, 2022) was an American editor and author. He was noted for writing Old Money: The Mythology of Wealth in America (Alfred A. Knopf, 1988; Allworth Press, 1996), Tommy Hitchcock: An American Hero (Fleet Street Corporation, 1985), as well as George, Being George (Random House, 2008), the story of author and socialite George Plimpton.

== Early life ==
Aldrich was born in Boston, Massachusetts, on April 11, 1935. His father, Nelson Aldrich III, worked as an architect and was chairman of the Institute of Contemporary Art, Boston; his mother was Eleanor (Tweed). They divorced when Aldrich was three years old. His great-grandfather, Nelson W. Aldrich, was a leader of the Republican Party in the Senate and fundamental in the founding of the Federal Reserve banking system in the United States. Aldrich initially attended the Fay School, before going to St. Paul's School in Concord, New Hampshire. He then studied American history and literature at Harvard College, where he was a member of the Porcellian Club and edited i.e., the Cambridge Review. He graduated in 1957, and went on to attend Sciences Po in Paris in the fall of that same year.

== Career ==
After relocating to Paris, Aldrich was asked by Robert B. Silvers to succeed him at The Paris Review. Silvers―whom Aldrich complimented for having the "patience of Job when it came to explaining anything"—consequently mentored Aldrich, who eventually became the magazine's Paris editor. Upon returning to the US, he taught at a public school in Harlem. He also worked as a reporter for the Boston Globe and was a frequent contributor to publications such as Vogue and Harper's. He subsequently became the senior editor of the latter publication and editor-in-chief of Civilization, the Library of Congress magazine. He taught at Long Island University and City College of New York, produced a television program, and was employed as a lobbyist.

Aldrich wrote the cover story to a January 1979 issue of the Atlantic, titled "Preppies: The Last Upper Class?" A decade later, he authored the book Old Money: The Mythology of Wealth in America. Fellow author Adam Hochschild characterized the work in the Los Angeles Times, calling it "as thoughtful a psychological portrait of America’s aristocracy as we have." Moreover, Jane O’Reilly in the New York Times Book Review described it as a "self-help book for those who have too much." Aldrich's daughter later recounted how he was spurred to write on the subject "by a need to understand, uncover, and explain to others the class he was born into."

Aldrich also penned a biography on Tommy Hitchcock Jr. that was published in 1985. He was awarded the Guggenheim Fellowship in 1989, in the field of study of general nonfiction. He later edited the book George, Being George (2008), an oral biography about his fellow literary journalist George Plimpton. The narrative was told via first-hand accounts, with Aldrich and seven other contributors interviewing 374 individuals connected to Plimpton.

== Personal life ==
Aldrich's first marriage was to Anna Lou Humes. Together, they had one child (Liberty). He also adopted one of her four daughters from her previous marriage (Alexandra). They separated in 1981 and eventually divorced. He nonetheless dedicated Old Money to her, crediting her with having "always propped up my morale". He later married Denise Lovatt, with whom he had one child, Arabella. They remained married until his death. He also had another child (Alexander) from his relationship with Gillian Pretty Goldsmith, whom he met during his sojourn in Paris.

Aldrich died on March 8, 2022, at his home in North Stonington, Connecticut, a month before his 87th birthday. He suffered from Parkinson's disease prior to his death.
