= Kamini Avril =

American painter (born 1955)

- Born: September 3, 1955 (age 70); Vallejo, California, U.S.
- Education: California Institute of the Arts (BFA); Bennington College (MFA)
- Spouse: William G. Tucker
- Children: 2 (including Shankar Tucker)
- Awards: Guggenheim Fellowship (1989)

Pamela Avril Tucker (born September 3, 1955), also known as Kamini Avril, is an American painter. A 1989 Guggenheim Fellow, she specializes in large paintings depicting humans and animals.

== Biography ==
Pamela Avril Tucker was born on September 3, 1955, in Vallejo, California. Her mother Dorothy Avril was an elementary school teacher who worked in Glassboro, New Jersey. After attending the Interlochen Arts Academy (1973) and the Yale Norfolk School of Art, She attended the California Institute of the Arts, where she obtained a BFA in 1977, and Bennington College where she obtained a MFA in 1980.

After participating in several group exhibitions, she had a solo exhibition at the Josef Gallery in New York City in 1983. In 1989, she was awarded a Guggenheim Fellowship for painting. In April 2020, she and her husband held their first joint solo exhibition, at the Bannister Gallery in Rhode Island College; Art New England remarked that the husband-and-wife duo "share a remarkably similar creative process, yet their work is profoundly different in medium, execution, and form". Her 2024 exhibit The Hands See What the Eye Feels focused on landscape depictions of greenery where "vines, bushes, creepers and other foliage provide an almost tactile feel".

Her paintings are usually large and rely on black charcoal and thick layers of paint, depicting humans, animals, and natural landscapes. According to Art New England, they "range from abstract to representational" and usually involve "energetic brushwork", The Windham Journal described her work as "gestural". Avril described her way of conceiving art: "Today, this isn’t easy, since we are inundated with visual information we process and discard immediately. But art needs duration." Avril explained that she has shifted from "deep feeling, often through a kind of non-linear storytelling" towards "the world observed and the innumerable mysteries of perception, as recreated through memory and making".

She is a regular exhibitor at Bowery Gallery in New York City and Oxbow Gallery in Easthampton, Massachusetts, and she is part of the Todi Arts Studio team at Villa Zefiro. She also worked as an art teacher at such institutions as Bard College, Chautauqua, the Mount Gretna School of Art, and the New York Studio School of Drawing, Painting and Sculpture.

She is married to British sculptor William G. Tucker, and they have two children, clarinetist Shankar Tucker and cellist Akshaya Avril Tucker. As of 1986, she was based in Willow, New York. By 2025, she had moved to Western Massachusetts; she is based in Ashfield, Massachusetts.

== Selected exhibitions ==
- Joint exhibition with William G. Tucker, Bannister Gallery at Rhode Island College, April 2020
- Joint exhibition with Claude Carone and Ruth Leonard, Greene County Gallery on the Arts Mountaintop Gallery (Windham, Maine), March 16 to May 6, 1996
- Frescos/Drawings, Oxbow Gallery (Easthampton, Massachusetts), October 2025.
