= Emilio Moran =

American anthropologist

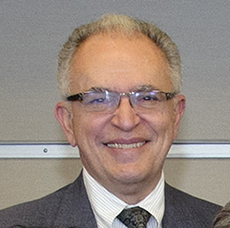
Moran at 2017 National Science Board

Emilio F. Moran (born July 21, 1946) is a Cuban and American anthropologist, retired from Indian University and affiliated with Michigan State University (MSU) since 2013.

== Background ==
Moran was raised in Havana, Cuba, and came to the United States during high school. He studied for a B.A. in Spanish American Literature at Spring Hill College in Alabama. He then completed an M.A. in Latin American History (1969) and a Ph.D. in Social Anthropology (1975) at the University of Florida, where he studied the effects of the Trans-Amazonian Highway.

Moran taught at Indiana University from 1975 to 2012, and is an emeritus professor there. He founded the Center for the Study of Institutions, People, and Environmental Change (CIPEC) with Elinor Ostrom. He taught briefly at the University of Arizona.

== Contributions ==
Moran was trained as an environmental anthropologist, focusing on populations in the Amazon Basin experiencing dislocation through resettlement, particularly from highways and dams. He has been extremely critical of large hydroelectric dams as a method to generate power, given their inefficiencies and effects on local populations and environments. He has shown how displaced Amazonian shifting cultivators moved to extensive annual cropping, and on to become intensive managers of permanent crops or irrigated areas in diversified livelihood systems. He used remote sensing methods and ground-level methods of data gathering to understand the linkages between global, regional and local-level processes. Research questions included how people impact forests, how they organize to manage their resources, and what role population plays in their shifting actions. His work was made difficult by the Brazilian military dictatorship (1964–1984) but since then, he has directed large scientific projects and involved Brazilian colleagues and PhD students.

More recently he has worked on solar panels and small generators suspended in jungle rivers in the Amazon, to bring lights, refrigeration, and cell phone charging to remote communities.

His work has been cited almost 40,000 times (2023).

== Publications ==
- 2019 The Dilemma Of Amazonian Development. Routledge.
- 2018 ed. Transforming Societies, Transforming Anthropology. University of Michigan Press.
- 2012. ed. by Garik Gutman et al. Land Change Science : Observing, Monitoring and Understanding Trajectories of Change on the Earth's Surface. Springer.
- 2010 Environmental Social Science: Human Environment Interactions and Sustainability. Oxford, UK: Wiley/Blackwell Publ.
- 2010 Meio Ambiente & Florestas (Environment and Forests, published in Portuguese). São Paulo: Editora SENAC
- 2007 Human Adaptability, Third Edition. Boulder, CO: Westview Press
- 2006 People and Nature. Oxford, UK: Blackwell Publ.
- 2005 ed. Moran and E Ostrom. Seeing the Forest and the Trees : Human-Environment Interactions in Forest Ecosystems. MIT Press.
- 1995 Editor, The Comparative Analysis of Human Societies: Toward Common Standards for Data Collection and Reporting. Rienner Publishers.
- 1993 The Human Ecology of Amazonian Populations. University of Iowa Press.
- 1991 Ed. The Ecosystem Approach in Anthropology: From Concept to Practice, University of Michigan Press
- 1981 Developing the Amazon: The Social and Ecological Impact of Settlement Along the Transamazon Highway. Indiana University Press

== Honors ==
- John Simon Guggenheim Memorial Foundation Fellowship 1989–1990
- Elected a Fellow, American Association for the Advancement of Science, 1985
- Fellow, Linnean Society of London 1999-
- 2002 Robert McC. Netting Award, American Association of Geographers
- Elected to the United States National Academy of Sciences, 2010
- Rachel Carson Distinguished Lecture in 2011
- Honorary PhD, MSU.
