= Joaquín Fermandois =

Chilean historian (born 1948)

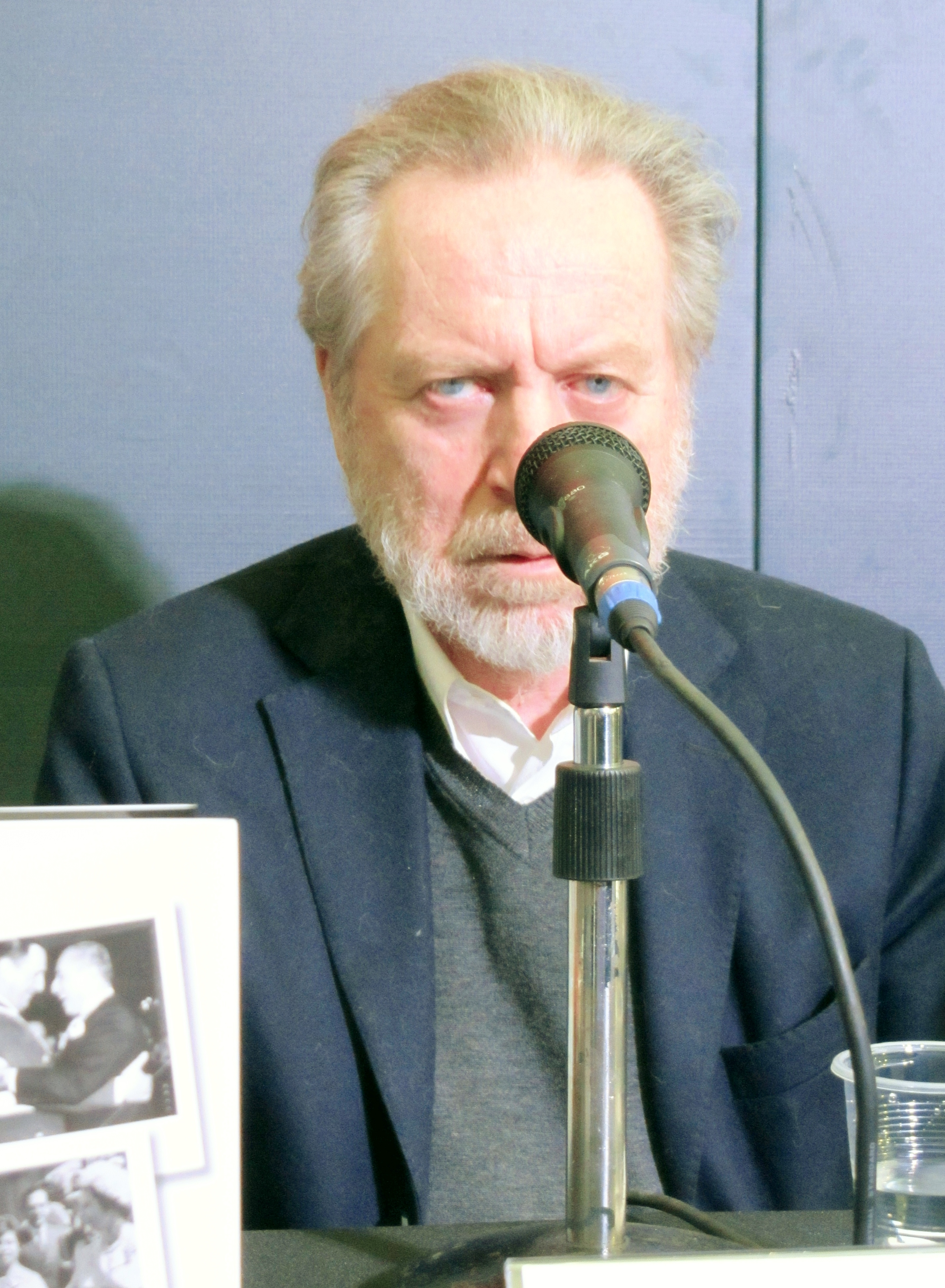

Personal details
- Born: 23 August 1948 (age 78) Vina del Mar, Chile
- Education: Pontifical Catholic University of Valparaíso (BA); University of Seville (PhD)
- Occupation: Researcher
- Profession: Historian

José Joaquín Fermandois Huerta (born 23 August 1948) is a Chilean historian and scholar.

A disciple of traditionalist thinkers like Mario Góngora and Héctor Herrera Cajas, he has claimed to be a follower of the British historian Arnold J. Toynbee.

== Biography ==
He studied History at the History Institute of the Pontifical Catholic University of Valparaíso, from which he graduated in 1970. Later, he did postgraduate studies in Germany and Spain, where he obtained a PhD from the University of Seville (1984).

A member of the Chilean Academy of History, he is a professor at the Institute of History of the Pontifical Catholic University of Chile.

He was deputy director of the Institute of International Studies at the University of Chile (1996−98). In addition to his work as a historian, he is a frequent columnist for the daily El Mercurio, being considered one of the most influential public intellectuals in Chile.

Through his texts, he has argued with other researchers about the foreign policy of the United States, the Popular Unity and the transformations that the Chilean society lived around the 20th century.
