= Dianne Blell =

American multimedia artist and fine art photographer

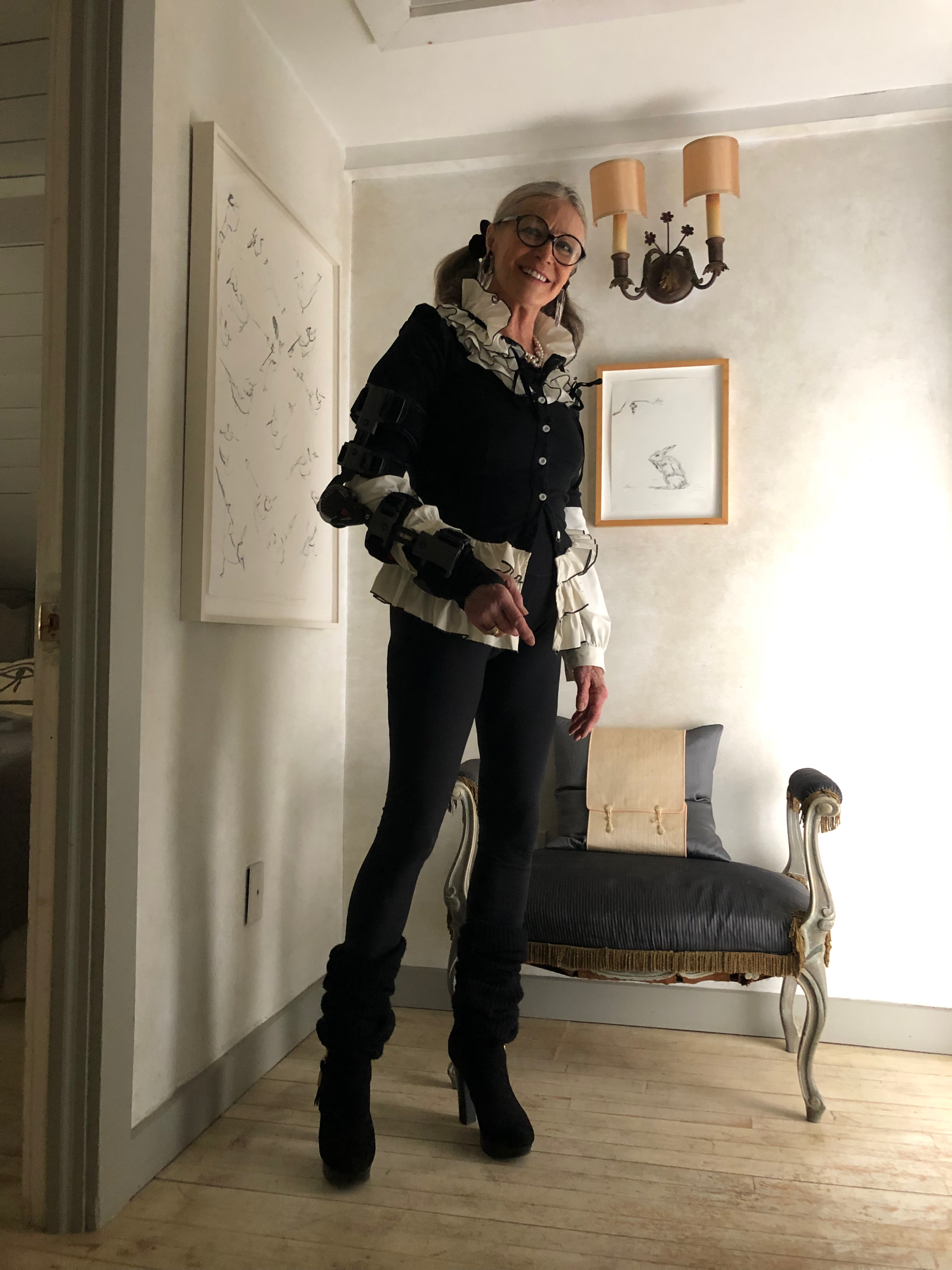
- Dianne Blell in 2019
- Born: 1943 (age 82–83)
- Education: University of San Diego, College for Women, San Francisco Art Institute
- Known for: Photography
- Awards: John Simon Guggenheim Fellowship, New York Foundation for the Arts Grant, National Endowment for the Arts Fellowship
- Website: dianneblell.com

Dianne Blell (born 1943) is an American multimedia artist and fine art photographer recognized for her staged photographs and conceptual tableaux that integrate photography, performance, painting, and installation art. Blell's work references classical mythology, art history, and romantic literature, constructing sets and costumes to reinterpret historical artworks in contemporary multimedia compositions. Her career spans from early performance pieces to digital photocompositions in the 1980s and more recently, explorations of objects and artifacts.

== Early life and education ==
Blell was born in 1943 in Los Angeles, California, and grew up in Chicago and La Jolla. In her teenage years, her family moved to La Jolla, California, and she became exposed to contemporary art at The Art Center in La Jolla, where she took life drawing courses. In 1970, she enrolled at the San Francisco Art Institute, where she received a Bachelor of Fine Arts and a Master of Fine Arts degrees.

== Work ==
In the mid-1970s in San Francisco, Blell staged performances such as Surrealism and the Blues (1975) inspired by Magritte. For the installation, she occupied an abandoned storefront space, appearing as a figure in a high window while blues music played, creating a scene reminiscent of a living surreal tableau. During this time Blell showed at Tom Marioni's salon in San Francisco.

One of Blell's conceptual works from this period was Odalisque (1976). The work took the form of a provocative billboard project installed in San Francisco’s North Beach nightlife district. The piece received coverage in newspapers ranging from local outlets to those in China—where it became known as "Nude Mocks Broadway." Documentation from the piece is held in multiple private collections and institutions, including the UC Berkeley Art Museum and Archives.

In 1978, Blell had a solo exhibition in the MATRIX program at the University Art Museum in Berkeley titled Portrait of a Lady for a Contemporary Collection. Materials from the exhibition, are held in the Dianne Blell / MATRIX 9 archive and are documented in the book Matrix Berkeley: A Changing Exhibition of Contemporary Art 1978–79. After 1978, Blell began developing a series of staged allegorical scenes. During this time, Blell returned to school between 1981 and 1982, studying 35mm and large-format photography at both the International Center of Photography (ICP) and Parsons School of Design. In this work, Blell reproduces and reinterprets the work of David, Ingres and other "master" painters. Art critic Donald Kuspit noted that Blell's method of re-staging classical images as "photo-tableaux" effectively "breathes new aesthetic life into them." During this time, Blell produced the series Charmed Heads and Urban Cupids based on classical portraits of women from art history and fashion photography. In these images, Blell herself appears as the model, styled in high-fashion contemporary designer clothing and posed in scenarios that juxtapose the romantic imagery of cherubs and demi-goddesses with modern urban settings. Another image, Future Perfect, portrays Blell as Psyche with the Three Mile Island in the background.

In the early 1980s she had the solo shows, Various Fabulous Monsters and The Pursuit of Love at the Leo Castelli Gallery. Her series, The Pursuit of Love, focused on scenes of courtship and romance drawn from Neo-Classical paintings.

In 1990, Blell created her Wildlives exhibit. The exhibit featured photographs of wildlife in their natural habitats, particularly focusing on Africa's diminishing animal populations.

After learning to use PhotoShop in 2000, Blell created the series Desire for the Intimate Deity, inspired by the mythology of Hindu folklore. In the mid-2010s, Blell began photographing standalone objects and artifacts that held personal or historical significance.

== Personal life ==
Blell lives and works between New York City and Bridgehampton, Long Island.

== Collections ==
A photograph by Blell was gifted to the permanent collection of the Metropolitan Museum of Art, and the Chazen Museum of Art collection. Blell's documentary photographs of 911 Ground Zero are held in the collection of the National September 11 Memorial & Museum.

The Smithsonian American Art Museum holds an archive of her papers and ephemera. In 2012, Blell was invited to participate in an oral history interview by the Archives of American Art (Smithsonian Institution).

== Awards ==
Blell received a Guggenheim Fellowship in 1989, and a National Endowment for the Arts (NEA) Fellowship.
