= Sam Samore =

American artist

Sam Samore is an American artist. His work is concerned with an exploration of privacy and myth in contemporary society. He has made numerous works which appropriate photo-techniques typically used by private detectives. His photographs have been described of having a film noir-like quality.

== Exhibitions and collections ==
In 1994, Samore had a solo show at Kunsthalle Zurich. In 2007, Samore had a solo exhibition at the Museum of Modern Art entitled The Suicidist. His work has been reviewed in Art in America, Artforum, among other publications. Several works by Samore are held in the permanent collection of the Whitney Museum of American Art, and the Walker Art Center.
