= Jason Aronson =

American publisher

- Parent company: Rowman & Littlefield
- Country of origin: United States
- Headquarters location: Lanham, Maryland
- Publication types: Books
- Official website: rowman.com/JasonAronson

Jason Aronson was an American publisher of books in the field of psychotherapy. Topics dealt with in these books include child therapy, family therapy, couple therapy, object relations therapy, play therapy, depression, eating disorders, personality disorders, substance abuse, sexual abuse, stress, trauma, bereavement, and other subjects.

Jason Aronson, Inc. Publishers, founded by its namesake Jason Aronson (an American psychologist), was acquired by Rowman & Littlefield Publishers, Inc. in December 2003, and since then it operated as an imprint.

Jason Aronson also released new books in the field of Jewish studies. These included titles covering Jewish life, history, theology, genealogy, folklore, holidays, and Hasidic thought.

The last new book under the Jason Aronson imprint was Essential Figures in Jewish Scholarship by Ronald L. Eisenberg, published in March 2014.
