= Social comparison theory =

Theory in social psychology

Social comparison theory, initially proposed by social psychologist Leon Festinger in 1954, centers on the belief that individuals drive to gain accurate self-evaluations. The theory explains how individuals evaluate their opinions and abilities by comparing themselves to others to reduce uncertainty in these domains and learn how to define the self. Comparing oneself to others socially is a form of measurement and self-assessment to identify where an individual stands according their own set of standards and emotions about themselves.

Following the initial theory, research began to focus on social comparison as a way of self-enhancement, introducing the concepts of downward and upward comparisons and expanding the motivations of social comparisons. Social comparison can be traced back to the pivotal paper by Herbert Hyman, back in 1942. Hyman revealed the assessment of one's own status is dependent on the group with whom one compares oneself. The social comparison theory is the belief that media influence, social status, and other forms of competitiveness can affect our self-esteem and mood. This can affect individuals' outlook on themselves and how they fit in with others.

== History ==
Leon Festinger was an American psychologist who developed the concept of social comparison theory.

Festinger put forward many hypotheses about social comparison theory. First, he explained that humans always examine their own views and capabilities in comparison with other people and have the urge to evaluate themselves accordingly. In addition, he argued that these comparisons tend to decrease as the difference between oneself and the other individual with whom one compares oneself begins to increase. He also thought that people have a desire to achieve greater abilities, but there are social constraints that make it difficult to achieve this, and this is often not sufficiently reflected in society's views.

He continued with the idea that ending comparisons between oneself and others would lead to hostility and disdain of ideas. Their hypothesis also stated that making a change in the importance of a comparison group would increase the pressure to conform to that group. However, he added that if the person, image, or comparison group is very different from the evaluator, the tendency to narrow the range of comparability will become stronger (Festinger, 1954). Lastly, he hypothesized that the comparers' tendencies would be influenced by their distance from the comparison group's mode, with those who are closer to the mode having higher tendencies to change and those who are farther away having less (Festinger, 1954).

=== Initial framework ===
In the theory, Festinger provided nine main hypotheses:

1. First, he stated that humans have a basic drive to evaluate their opinions and abilities and that people evaluate themselves through objective, nonsocial means (Hypothesis I).
2. Second, Festinger stated that if objective, nonsocial means were not available, people would evaluate their opinions and abilities by comparison to other people (Hypothesis II).
3. Next, he hypothesized that the tendency to compare oneself to another person decreases as the difference between their opinions and abilities becomes more divergent. In other words, if someone is much different from you, you are less likely to compare yourself to that person (Hypothesis III).
4. He next hypothesized that there is a unidirectional drive upward in the case of abilities, which is largely absent in opinions. This drive refers to the value that is placed on doing better and better. (Hypothesis IV).
5. Next, Festinger hypothesizes that nonsocial restraints make it difficult or even impossible to change one's ability. These restraints are mainly absent for opinions. People can change their thoughts when they want to. Still, no matter how motivated individuals may be to improve their ability, other elements may make this impossible (Hypothesis V).
6. Festinger hypothesizes that the cessation of comparison with others is accompanied by hostility or derogation to the extent that continued comparison with those persons implies unpleasant consequences (Hypothesis VI)
7. Next, any factors that increase the importance of some particular group as a comparison group from some specific opinion or ability will increase the pressure toward uniformity concerning that ability or opinion within that group. Suppose discrepancies arise between the evaluator and the comparison group. In that case, there is a tendency to reduce the divergence by either attempting to persuade others or changing their personal views to attain uniformity. However, the importance, relevance, and attraction to a comparison group that affects the original motivation for comparison mediate the pressures towards uniformity (Hypothesis VII).
8. His following hypothesis states that if persons divergent from one's own opinion or ability are perceived as different from oneself on attributes consistent with the divergence, the tendency to narrow the range of comparability becomes stronger (Hypothesis VIII).
9. Lastly, Festinger hypothesized that when there is a range of opinions or abilities in a group, the relative strength of the three manifestations of pressures toward uniformity will be different for those who are close to the group's mode than those who are distant from the mode. Those close to the mode will have stronger tendencies to change the positions of others, weaker tendencies to narrow the range of comparison, and even weaker tendencies to change their own opinions (Hypothesis IX).

=== Theoretical advances ===
Since its inception, the initial framework has undergone several advances. Key among these are developments in understanding the motivations that underlie social comparisons and the particular types of social comparisons that are made. Motives that are relevant to social comparison include self-enhancement, maintenance of a positive self-evaluation, components of attributions and validation, and the avoidance of closure. While there have been changes in Festinger's original concept, many fundamental aspects remain, including the prevalence of the tendency towards social comparison and the general process that is social comparison.

== Compare and contrast self-evaluation to self-enhancement ==
According to Thorton and Arrowood, self-evaluation is one of the functions of social comparison. This is one process that underlies how an individual engages in social comparison. Each individual's specific goals will influence how they engage in social comparison. For self-evaluation, people tend to choose a similar comparison target. Specifically, they are most interested in choosing a target who shares some distinctive characteristic with themselves. They also think that knowing the truth about themselves is salutary. Research suggests that most people believe that choosing a similar target helps ensure the accuracy of the self-evaluation. However, individuals do not always act as unbiased self-evaluators and accurate self-evaluations may not be the primary goal of social comparison. There have been many studies and they have shown that American women tend to be dissatisfied with their looks, they either rate themselves "too plain, old, pimply, fat, hairy, tall" and so much more. Women are much more sensitive than men, especially with it having to do with their physical appearance. Due to media digitally altering women's appearance from the width of their torso or arms to the softness of their complexion creates the ideal that thin and flawless is the only acceptable way to look. This leads to diet culture, excessive exercise, and had led to many eating disorders. This form of social comparison can cause harm and can affect the development of the way someone sees themselves.

Individuals may also seek self-enhancement, or to improve their self-esteem. They may interpret, distort, or ignore the information gained by social comparison to see themselves more positively and further their self-enhancement goals. People also seek self-enhancement because holding favorable illusions about themselves is gratifying. They will also choose to make upward (comparing themselves to someone better off) or downward (comparing themselves to someone worse off) comparisons, depending on which strategy will further their self-enhancement goals. Specifically, when an individual believes that their ability in a specific area is low, they will avoid making upward social comparisons in that area. Unlike self-evaluation goals, people engaging in social comparison with the goal of self-enhancement may not seek out a similar target. In fact, if a target's similarity is seen as a threat due to the target outperforming the individual on some dimension, the individual may downplay the similarity of the target to themselves. This notion ties closely to the phenomena in psychology introduced also by Leon Festinger himself as it relates to the diminishing of cognitive dissonance. This dissonance causes a psychological uncomfortableness that motivates a person to remove the dissonance. The more dissonance there is, the greater sense of pressure to remove the dissonance and uncomfortableness caused by it. One does not want to perceive oneself in a way that would downplay one's original belief upon which one's self-esteem is based and therefore in order to reduce the cognitive dissonance, one is willing to change the cognitive representation of the other person whom one compares oneself to, such that one's own belief about oneself remains intact. This effectively leads to the comparison of apples to oranges or psychological denial.

=== Article ===
When individuals engage in self-comparisons, a complex interplay of psychological and motivational factors comes into play, driving them to become more competitive. One of the key mechanisms at play is the motivation for self-improvement. For instance, in an academic setting, students compare themselves to peers who consistently achieve higher grades can spark a sense of determination and desire to excel in school. Moreover, the comparison to those perceived as superior serves as a powerful catalyst for personal growth and development. when individuals benchmark themselves against someone they view as highly successful, whether in their professional career or personal achievements, it triggers a process of emulation. the desire to achieve a comparable level of success becomes a driving force, propelling individuals to set higher goals, strive for excellence, and continuously evolve to reach the standards set by their role models. The process of self-comparison is deeply ingrained in human nature, and it serves as a fundamental aspect of our social and psychological development. While comparing ourselves to others can offer valuable insights and motivation, the way we engage in this process can vary widely, influencing our self-perception and overall well-being. the interplay between self-comparison, self-enhancement, and positive self-evaluation highlights the complexity of human psychology. While these cognitive processes can contribute to resilience and self-confidence, they also carry the risk of distorting reality and fostering an unrealistic self-image. striking a balance between acknowledging personal strengths and weaknesses, learning from others, and maintaining a healthy level of self-awareness is essential for overall psychological well-being.

Later advances in theory led to self-enhancement being one of the four self-evaluation motives:, along with self-assessment, self-verification, and self-improvement.

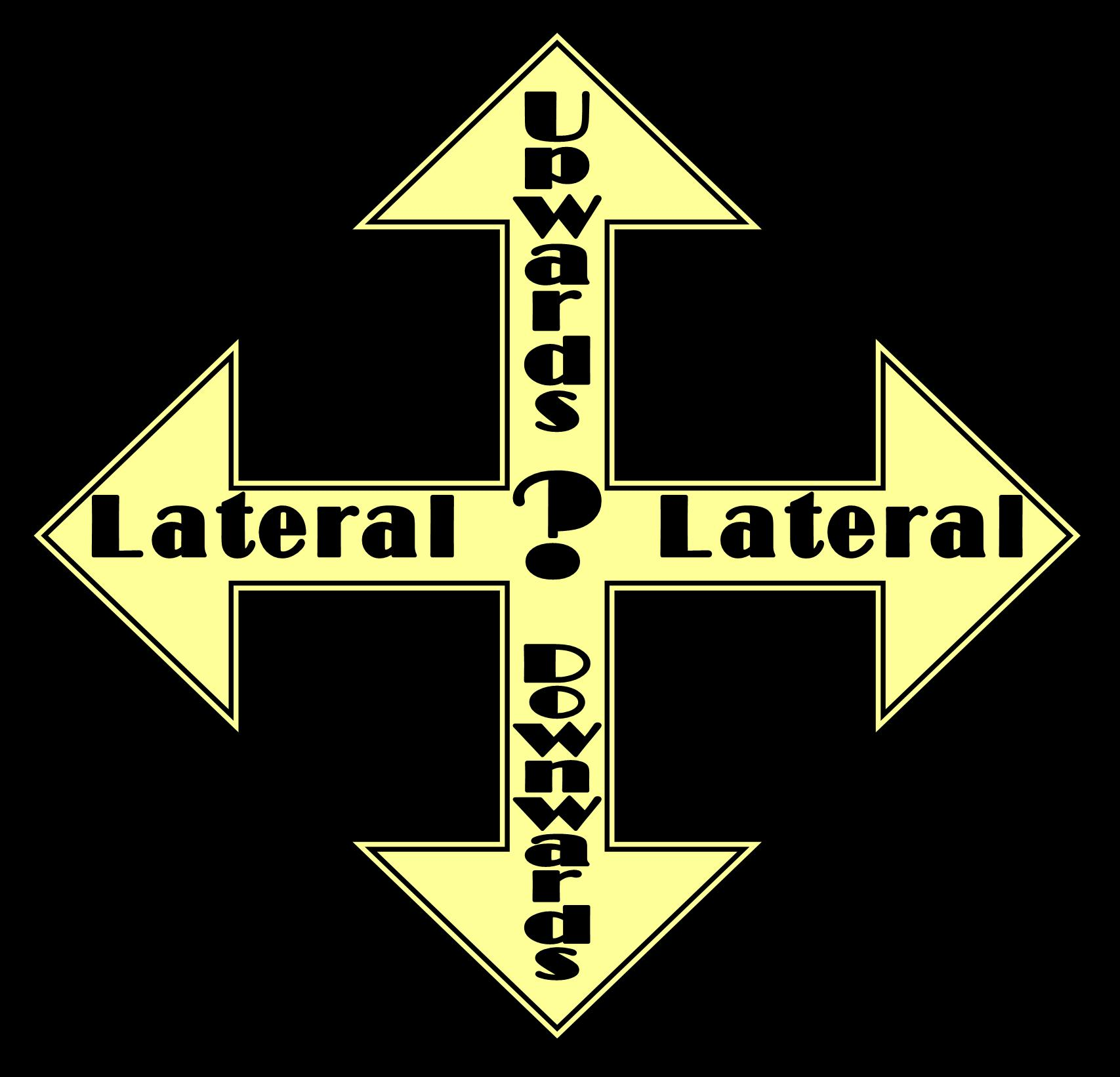
Different types of comparison include upward, downward, and lateral comparison.

=== Upward and downward social comparisons ===
Wills introduced the concept of downward comparison in 1981. Downward social comparison is a defensive tendency that is used as a means of self-evaluation. When a person looks to another individual or group that they consider to be worse off than themselves in order to feel better about their personal situation, they are making a downward social comparison. Research has suggested that social comparisons with others who are better off or superior, or upward comparisons, can lower self-regard, whereas downward comparisons can elevate self-regard. Downward comparison theory emphasizes the positive effects of comparisons in increasing one's subjective well-being. For example, it has been found that breast cancer patients made the majority of comparisons with patients less fortunate than themselves. Ashby found similar results in his experiment showing, downward comparison in people subjected to distress from a physical illness such as heart disease or cancer. They also see those who recover from the same illness, and the study found that patients tended to be more optimistic about their own recovery.

Although social comparison research has suggested that upward comparisons can lower self-regard, Collins indicates that this is not always the case. Individuals make upward comparisons, whether consciously or subconsciously when they compare themselves with an individual or comparison group that they perceive as superior or better than themselves in order to improve their views of self or to create a more positive perception of their personal reality. Upward social comparisons are made to self-evaluate and self-improve in the hopes that self-enhancement will also occur. In an upward social comparison, people want to believe themselves to be part of the elite or superior and make comparisons highlighting the similarities between themselves and the comparison group, unlike a downward social comparison, where similarities between individuals or groups are disassociated.

It has also been suggested that upward comparisons may provide an inspiration to improve, and in one study, it was found that while breast cancer patients made more downward comparisons, they showed a preference for information about more fortunate others.

Another study indicated that people who were dieting often used upward social comparisons by posting pictures of thinner people on their refrigerators. These pictures served not only as a reminder of an individual's current weight but also as an inspiration for a goal to be reached. In simple terms, downward social comparisons are more likely to make us feel better about ourselves, while upward social comparisons are more likely to motivate us to achieve more or reach higher.

The influence of social media on self-comparisons adds another layer of discussion. Social media platforms, with their curated content and highlight reels, often become arenas for people to engage in upward social comparisons. The contrast streams of carefully crafted images and updates create an environment where people feel compelled to showcase the positive aspects of their lives, contributing to the phenomenon of self-preservation. The pressure to maintain a favorable online image can intensify the desire for upward social comparisons, as individuals strive to present themselves in the best possible light. The fear of missing out (FOMO) becomes a significant factor in this context. Seeing peers enjoying seemingly enriching experiences, luxurious lifestyles, or achieving notable milestones can trigger anxiety and a sense of inadequacy in those making comparisons. Research has indeed indicated a correlation between upward social comparison on social media and negative well-being. People who frequently engage in comparing their lives to the seemingly superior lives of others may experience heightened levels of stress, dissatisfaction, and even symptoms of social media addiction. The constant exposure to idealized representations can create unrealistic standards, fostering a perpetual cycle of discontent. Moreover, the addictive nature of social media platforms, driven by the need for validation through likes and comments, further amplifies the impact of upward social comparison.

=== Moderators of social comparison ===
Aspinwall and Taylor looked at mood, self-esteem, and threat as moderators that drive individuals to choose to make upward or downward social comparisons. Downward comparisons in cases where individuals had experienced a threat to their self-esteem produced more favorable self-evaluations.

==== High self-esteem and social comparison ====
Aspinwall and Taylor found that upward social comparisons were good in circumstances where the individuals making the comparisons had high self-esteem because these types of comparisons provided them with more motivation and hope than downward social comparisons. However, if these individuals had experienced a recent threat or setback to their self-esteem, they reported that upward comparisons resulted in a more negative affect than downward comparisons. Positive self-evaluation, a related concept, involves people assessing themselves in a more positive light than external or objective criteria. This cognitive bias can manifest in various ways, such as perceiving oneself as more competent, attractive, or virtuous than others perceive them. Positive self-evaluation is a different process that goes beyond comparison and involves introspection, critical analysis, and reflection on one's strengths, weaknesses, and progress in specific areas.

==== Low self-esteem and social comparison ====
However, people with low self-esteem or people who are experiencing some sort of threat in their life (such as doing poorly in school, or suffering from an illness) tend to favor downward comparisons over upward comparisons. People with low self-esteem and negative affect improve their mood by making downward comparisons. Their mood does not improve as much as it would if they had high self-esteem. Even for people with low self-esteem, these downward social comparisons do improve their negative mood and allow them to feel hope and motivation for their future. However, these feelings of hope could deter them from succeeding due to the harshness with which they judge themselves for their successes and failures. Lower self-esteem can lead an individual to have higher standards for themselves but may never achieve them due to the judgment they receive from within.

==== Affect/mood and its effect on social comparison ====
Individuals who have a negative mood improve their mood by making upward social comparisons, regardless of their level of self-esteem. In addition, both individuals with high self-esteem and low self-esteem who are in a positive mood elevate their mood further by making upward comparisons. However, for those who have recently experienced a threat to their self-esteem or a setback in their life, making upward social comparisons instead of downward social comparisons results in a more negative effect. Self-esteem and the existence of a threat or setback in an individual's life are two moderators of their response to upward or downward comparisons.

=== Competitiveness ===
Because individuals are driven upwards in the case of abilities, social comparisons can drive competition among peers. In this regard, a comparison's psychological significance depends on an individual's social status and the context in which their abilities are being evaluated. One interesting psychological phenomenon related to self-comparison is the concept of self-enhancement. This occurs when people, consciously or unconsciously, focus on the weaknesses or shortcomings of others as a means of boosting their self-esteem. by highlighting the flaws of others, people can create a comparative context where they perceive themselves in a more favorable light. this self-enhancement strategy is often driven by the fundamental human desire to maintain a positive self-image and preserve one's sense of worth.

==== Social status ====
Competitiveness resulting from social comparisons may be greater in relation to higher social status because individuals with more status have more to lose. In one study, students in a classroom were presented with a bonus point program where, based on chance, some students' grades would increase and others would remain the same. Although students could not lose by this program, higher-status individuals were more likely to object to the program and report a perceived distributive injustice. It was suggested that this was a cognitive manifestation of an aversion to downward mobility, which has more psychological significance when an individual has more status.

==== Proximity to a standard ====
When individuals are evaluated where meaningful standards exist, such as in an academic classroom where students are ranked, then competitiveness increases as proximity to a standard of performance increases. When the only meaningful standard is the top, then high-ranking individuals are most competitive with their peers, and individuals at low and intermediate ranks are equally competitive. However, when both high and low rankings hold significance, then individuals at high and low ranks are equally competitive and are both more competitive than individuals at intermediate ranks.

=== Models of social comparison ===
Several models have been introduced to social comparison, including the self-evaluation maintenance model (SEM), proxy model, the triadic model and the three-selves model.

==== Self-evaluation maintenance model ====
The SEM model proposes that we make comparisons to maintain or enhance our self-evaluations, focusing on the antagonistic processes of comparison and reflection. Abraham Tesser has researched self-evaluation dynamics that have taken several forms. A self-evaluation maintenance (SEM) model of social behavior focuses on the consequences of another person's outstanding performance on one's own self-evaluation. It sketches out some conditions under which the other's good performance bolsters self-evaluation, i.e., "basking in reflected glory", and conditions under which it threatens self-evaluation through a comparison process.

==== Proxy model ====
The proxy model anticipates the success of something that is unfamiliar. The model proposes that if a person is successful or familiar with a task, then he or she would also be successful at a new, similar task. The proxy is evaluated based on ability and is concerned with the question, "Can I do X?" A proxy's comparison is based on previous attributes. The opinion of the comparer and whether the proxy exerted maximum effort on a preliminary task are variables influencing his or her opinion.

==== Triadic model ====
The Triadic Model builds on the attribution elements of social comparison, proposing that opinions of social comparison are best considered in terms of 3 different evaluative questions: preference assessment (i.e., "Do I like X?"), belief assessment (i.e., "Is X correct?"), and preference prediction (i.e., "Will I like X?"). In the Triadic Model, the most meaningful comparisons are with a person who has already experienced a proxy and exhibits consistency in related attributes or past preferences.

==== Three-selves model ====
The three-selves model proposes that social comparison theory is a combination of two different theories. One theory is developed around motivation and the factors that influence the type of social comparison information people seek from their environment, and the second is about self-evaluation and the factors that influence the effects of social comparisons on the judgments of self. While there has been much research in the area of comparison motives, there has been little in the area of comparative evaluation. Explaining that the self is conceived as interrelated conceptions accessible depending upon current judgment context and taking a cue from Social Cognitive Theory, this model examines the Assimilation effect and distinguishes three classes of working Self-concept ideas: individual selves, possible selves and collective selves.

== Cultural influences ==
Cultural factors may contribute to differences in the tendency to engage in and effects of social comparisons. For example, there are two cultural dimensions that are characterized by how the self is viewed and the values that are held: individualistic and collectivistic cultures.

=== Individualistic and collectivistic cultures ===
Individualistic cultures, often associated with European-American individuals, have an independent view of the self and emphasize individuality. Individuals from these cultures were found to be more likely to engage in social comparisons and have higher competitiveness, as they may have more desire to distinguish themselves from others. They may also more likely to self-enhance, especially in more expressive ways that are commonly investigated in the current literature. Additionally, upwards social comparisons to members of in-groups may tend to result in more negative effects on self-esteem in these cultures.

Contrarily, collectivistic cultures, often associated with Asian individuals, have an interdependent view of the self and emphasize group harmony. These cultures are less likely to overtly express self-enhancement, and may use more subtle methods to maintain positive self-regard. Furthermore, upwards social comparisons to members of in-groups tend to result in more positive effects on self-esteem. This could be because interdependent cultures become more closely connected with their group identity, thus their self-esteem changes to align more strongly with the individual they are comparing themselves to.

== Media influence ==
The influence of media has been found to play a large role in social comparisons. Researchers examining the social effects of the media have found that in most cases, women tend to engage in upward social comparisons, measuring themselves against some form of societal ideal with a target other, which results in more negative feelings about the self. Social comparisons have become a relevant mechanism for learning about appearance-related social expectations among peers and for evaluating the self in terms of those standards. Although men do make upward comparisons, research finds that more women make upward comparisons and are comparing themselves with unrealistically high standards presented in the media. As women are shown more mainstream media images of powerful, successful, and thin women, they perceive the "ideal" to be the norm for societal views of attractiveness.

Self-perceived similarities with role models on social media can also affect self-esteem for both men and women. Having more self-perceived similarities with a role model can help increase self-esteem, while having less can decrease self-esteem. Social comparison with peers on social media can also lead to feelings of self-pity or satisfaction. The desire for social comparison can cause FoMO and compulsive checking of social media sites.

Over the years, Instagram has become one of the largest social media platforms, mainly among the younger generations. With the growing popularity, individuals worry that this platform may lead to significant emotional burdens, including stress, anxiety, or well-being. A 2020 cross-sectional online survey study in Singapore empirically tested the pathway that linked Instagram to social anxiety. The findings demonstrated that using Instagram would not directly increase social anxiety, but it would instead affect social comparison and self-esteem. There should be continuous research on the underlying impacts of social media on emotional security and help educators design better programs to support the ongoing positive growth of wellness during this digital era.

When looking at social media platforms, studies have been conducted to analyze the interaction between social networking sites and the upward comparisons viewers can make when viewing their content. Looking specifically at Instagram, a study conducted at the University of Florida in 2021 examined students' emotions when looking at posts on the platform. The participants in the study assessed themselves more negatively after being presented with this content and felt worse about themselves, which the researchers were able to conclude were similar to the emotions felt when an individual upwardly compared themselves within Social Comparison Theory.

Another emerging media platform is fitness-tracking apps. Shanghai Jiaotong University and East China University of Science and Technology conducted a study in 2018 looking at these apps and Social Comparison theory. They found within their research that people who use these apps could be affected by upward social comparison. Individuals who upwardly compared themselves to other individuals using the app were less likely to want to keep using it.

Teens often feel inferior when looking at their peers' posts with high achievements and many friends, leading them to have upward comparisons. In contrast, when Teens look at their peers' posts with fewer friends and achievements, they make downward comparisons. In 2019, Newport Academy conducted a longitudinal survey of 219 first-year students at a university, showing compelling results on the correlation between social media and the theory of social comparison. The researchers' results indicated that the different social media comparisons imply that some comparisons are more favorable than others. This, overall, may affect a teen's identity development. Most comparisons can cause negative introspection and personal distress. In contrast, others regard it as an opinion that increases others' well-being. When teens feel empowered, they can express their vulnerable views, supporting identity formation. More research concludes the influence of parents can also help reduce the negative impact of social media comparison. Parents' support and unconditional love mitigate anguish associated with teen social comparison.

Studies have shed light on the dynamic of social comparison on Instagram, especially among women. The pursuit of likes and comments becomes a quantifiable metric for assessing social approval and attractiveness. The number of likes a post receives and the nature of the comments can, in some cases, be internalized as a reflection of one's personal appearance and overall appeal. This quantification of online validation can create tangible and, at times, unhealthy links between social media engagement and self-esteem. For women, in particular, Instagram can be a platform for implicit competition, where the number of followers, the aesthetic quality of posts, and the overall engagement metrics contribute to a sense of social standing. The pressure to conform to beauty standards perpetuated on the platform can fuel an ongoing cycle of comparison, influencing self-perception and self-worth. Additionally, the emphasis on curated edited images on Instagram can contribute to a distorted sense of reality. women find themselves comparing their everyday lives to the carefully constructed and filtered snapshots presented by others, potentially leading to feelings of inadequacy and the perpetuation of unrealistic beauty standards.

== Criticisms ==
Many criticisms arose regarding Festinger's similarity hypothesis. Deutsch and Krauss argued that people seek out dissimilar others in their comparisons, maintaining that this is important for providing valuable self-knowledge, as demonstrated in research. Ambiguity also circulated about the critical dimensions for similarity. Goethals and Darley clarified the role of similarity, suggesting that people prefer to compare those who are similar on related attributes such as opinions, characteristics or abilities to increase confidence for value judgments. However, those dissimilar in related attributes are preferred when validating one's beliefs.

== See also ==
- Respect
- Rat race
- Competition
- Social stress
- Social anxiety
- Peer pressure
- Frog pond effect
- Social inequality
- Social projection
- Identity formation
- Rational expectations
- Achievement ideology
- In-group and out-group
- Basking in reflected glory
- Subjective theory of value
- Keeping up with the Joneses
