= Self-handicapping =

Cognitive strategy

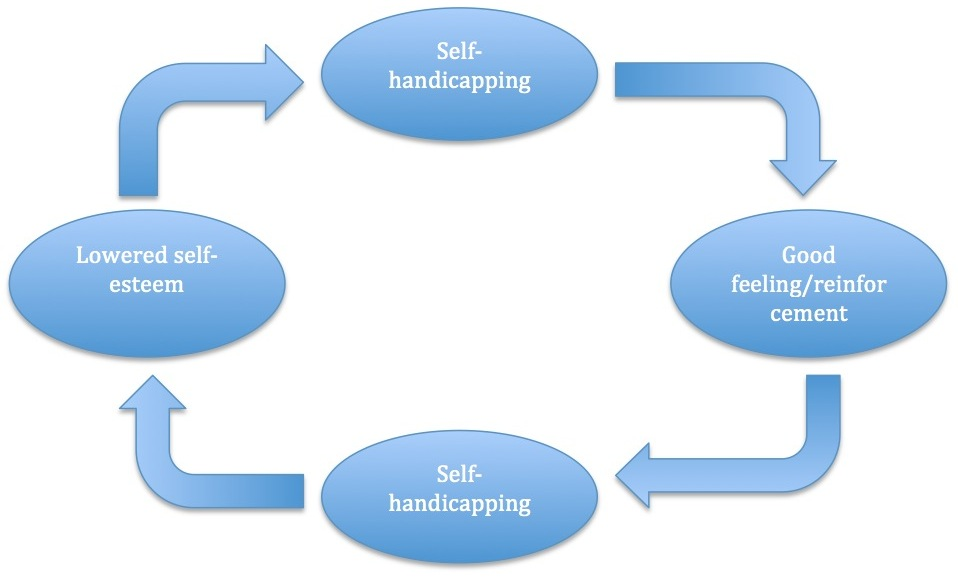
Cyclical depiction of reinforcement in self-handicapping

Self-handicapping is a cognitive strategy by which people avoid effort in the hopes of keeping potential failure from hurting self-esteem. It was first theorized by Edward E. Jones and Steven Berglas, according to whom self-handicaps are obstacles created, or claimed, by the individual in anticipation of failing performance.

Self-handicapping can be seen as a method of preserving self-esteem but it can also be used for self-enhancement and to manage the impressions of others. This conservation or augmentation of self-esteem is due to changes in causal attributions or the attributions for success and failure that self-handicapping affords. There are two methods that people use to self-handicap: behavioral and claimed self-handicaps. People withdraw effort or create obstacles to successes so they can maintain public and private self-images of competence.

Self-handicapping is a widespread behavior amongst humans that has been observed in a variety of cultures and geographic areas. For instance, students frequently participate in self-handicapping behavior to avoid feeling bad about themselves if they do not perform well in class. Self-handicapping behavior has also been observed in the business world. The effects of self-handicapping can be both large and small and found in virtually any environment wherein people are expected to perform.

== Overview and relevance ==
The first method people use to self-handicap is when they make a task harder for themselves in fear of not successfully completing that task, so that if they do in fact fail, they can simply place the blame on the obstacles rather than placing the blame on themselves. This is known to researchers as behavioral handicapping, in which the individual actually creates obstacles to performance. Examples of behavioral handicaps include alcohol consumption, the selection of unattainable goals, and refusal to practice a task or technique (especially in sports and the fine arts). Some of these behaviors include procrastination, self-fulfilling prophecies of negative expectations, learned helplessness, self-handicapping, success avoidance, failures in self-regulation, addictions and risky behaviors.

The second way that people self-handicap is by coming up with justifications for their potential failures, so that if they do not succeed in the task, they can point to their excuses as the reasons for their failures. This is known as claimed self-handicapping, in which the individual merely states that an obstacle to performance exists. Examples of claimed self-handicaps include declarations that one is experiencing physical symptoms. When people engage in these behaviors they are doing so in order to protect their own self-esteem or to reduce or inhibit unpleasant emotions. These patterns of behaviors fall under different categories of Personality Disorders, some of which include dependent, borderline personality disorder, and obsessive personality disorders.

Self-handicapping behavior allows individuals to externalize failures but internalize success, accepting credit for achievements but allowing excuses for failings. Individuals that showed signs of unstable self-esteem were more likely to exhibit self-handicapping behaviors in an attempt to externalize failure and internalize success by action or performance setting choice. An example of self-handicapping is the student who spends the night before an important exam partying rather than studying. The student fears failing his exam and appearing incapable. In partying the night before the exam the student has engaged in self-defeating behavior and increased the likelihood of poor exam performance. However, in the event of failure, the student can offer fatigue and a hangover, rather than lack of ability, as plausible explanations. Furthermore, should the student receive positive feedback about his exam, his achievement is enhanced by the fact that he succeeded, despite the handicap. When faced with the possibility of failure, students exhibit some behaviors resulting in a reduction in overall effort, not allotting the proper amount of time to work or produce work, or postponing/procrastinating their work. The end goal is to find a way to blame academic failures on anything but their abilities themselves (Torok et al. 2018). These findings from this study combat Festinger’s social comparison theory (Festinger 1954.) This social comparison theory states that it is a fundamental human motive to obtain information based on their environment and gain feedback about their capabilities as such instead of setting themselves up for failure and refusing to take the blame.

A theory more closely related to the findings of the self-handicapping phenomenon with a similar background and basis is that of Covington's Self Worth Theory. According to Covington's theory, schools today have what is called a “zero sum scoring system”. This meaning that the recompense available in a classroom is limited and that one student wins, this means that other students are always meant to lose (Covington 1992). Individuals self worth is based on their perceived performance and abilities. Covington and Omelich describe effort as a "double-edged sword". This meaning that students feel a sense of urgency to make efforts in order to avoid being punished by their instructor causing them to experience feelings of negativity and guilt. All the while, students also face the chance of making an effort that involves the possible chance of feelings such as humiliation or shame if or when their effort results in failure. If their effort is proven to be unsuccessful, they believe that they will be seen as an unsuccessful person. According to Covington this means that students have only two choices. The first one being that they refuse to make an effort and take on the negativity of failure or perceived punishment. The second being that they in fact make an effort which creates a sense of vulnerability and opens the door to being judged as being unintelligent or lacking the proper abilities. This is why we see so many students using this self-handicapping mechanism as a last resort effort to protect themselves and their perceived positive self-image.

=== Individual differences ===
People differ in the extent to which they self-handicap and most research on individual differences has used the Self-Handicapping Scale (SHS). The SHS was developed as a means of measuring individuals' tendency to employ excuses or create handicaps as a means to protect one's self-esteem. Research to date shows that SHS has adequate construct validity. For example, individuals who score high on the SHS put in less effort and practice less when concerned about their ability to perform well in a given task. They are also more likely than those rated low self-handicappers (LSH) to mention obstacles or external factors that may hinder their success, prior to performing.

A number of characteristics have been related to self-handicapping (e.g. hypochondriasis) and research suggests that those more prone to self-handicapping may differ motivationally compared to those that do not rely on such defensive strategies. For example, fear of failure, a heightened sensitivity to shame and embarrassment upon failure, motivates self-handicapping behavior. Students who fear failure are more likely to adopt performance goals in the classroom or goals focused on the demonstration of competence or avoidance of demonstrating incompetence; goals that heighten one's sensitivity to failure.

A student, for example, may approach course exams with the goal of not performing poorly as this would suggest a lack of ability. To avoid ability attributions and the shame of failure, the student fails to adequately prepare for an exam. While this may provide temporary relief, it renders one's ability conceptions more uncertain, resulting in further self-handicapping.

=== Gender differences ===
While research suggests that claimed self-handicaps are used by men and women alike, several studies have reported significant differences. While research assessing differences in reported self-handicapping have revealed no gender differences or greater self-handicapping among females, the vast majority of research suggests that males are more inclined to behaviourally self-handicap. These differences are further explained by the different value men and women ascribe to the concept of effort.

== Major theoretical approaches ==
The root of research on the act of self-handicapping can be traced back to Adler's studies about self-esteem. In the late 1950s, Goffman and Heider published research concerning the manipulation of outward behavior for the purpose of impression management. It was not until 30 years later that self-handicapping behavior was attributed to internal factors. Until this point, self-handicapping only encompassed the usage of external factors, such as alcohol and drugs. Self-handicapping is usually studied in an experimental setting, but is sometimes studied in an observational environment.

Previous research has established that self-handicapping is motivated by uncertainty about one's ability or, more generally, anticipated threats to self-esteem. Self-handicapping can be exacerbated by self-presentational concerns but also occurs in situations where such concerns are at a minimum.

== Major empirical findings ==
Experiments on self-handicapping have depicted the reasons why people self-handicap and the effects that it has on those people. Self-handicapping has been observed in both laboratory and real world settings. Studying the psychological and physical effects of self-handicapping has allowed researchers to witness the dramatic effects that it has on attitude and performance.

Jones and Berglas gave people positive feedback following a problem-solving test, regardless of actual performance. Half the participants had been given fairly easy problems, while the others were given difficult problems. Participants were then given the choice between a "performance-enhancing drug" and a drug that would inhibit it. Those participants who received the difficult problems were more likely to choose the impairing drug, and participants who faced easy problems were more likely to choose the enhancing drug. It is argued that the participants presented with hard problems, believing that their success had been due to chance, chose the impairing drug because they were looking for an external attribution (what might be called an "excuse") for expected poor performance in the future, as opposed to an internal attribution.

More recent research finds that, generally, people are willing to use handicaps to protect their self-esteem (e.g., discounting failings) but are more reluctant to employ them for self-enhancement. (e.g., to further credit their success). Rhodewalt, Morf, Hazlett, and Fairfield (1991) selected participants who scored high or low on the Self-Handicapping Scale (SHS) and who had high or low self-esteem. They presented participants with a handicap and then with success or failure feedback and asked participants to make attributions for their performance. The results showed that both self-protection and self-enhancement occurred, but only as a function of levels of self-esteem and the level of tendency to self-handicap. Participants who were high self-handicappers, regardless of their level of self-esteem, used the handicap as a means of self-protection but only those participants with high self-esteem used the handicap to self-enhance.

In a further study, Rhodewalt (1991) presented the handicap to only half of the participants and gave success and failure feedback. The results provided evidence for self-protection but not for self-enhancement. Participants in the failure feedback, handicap absent group, attributed their failures to their own lack of ability and reported lower self-esteem to the handicap-present, failure-feedback condition. Furthermore, the handicap-present failure group reported levels of self-esteem equal to that of the successful group. This evidence highlights the importance of self-handicaps in self-protection although it offers no support for the handicap acting to self-enhance.

Another experiment, by Martin Seligman and colleagues, examined whether there was a correlation between explanatory styles and the performance of swimmers. After being given false bad times on their preliminary events, the swimmers who justified their poor performance to themselves in a pessimistic way did worse on subsequent performances. In contrast, the subsequent performances of those swimmers who had more optimistic attributions concerning their poor swimming times were not affected. Those who had positive attributions were more likely to succeed after given false times because they were self-handicapping. They attributed their failure to an external force rather than blaming themselves. Therefore, their self-esteem remained intact, which led to their success in subsequent events. This experiment demonstrates the positive effects that self-handicapping can have on an individual because when they attributed the failure to an external factor, they did not internalize the failure and let it psychologically affect them.

Previous research has looked at the consequences of self-handicapping and have suggested that self-handicapping leads to a more positive mood (at least in the short term) or at least guards against a drop in positive mood after failure. Thus, self-handicapping may serve as a means of regulating one's emotions in the course of protecting one's self-esteem. However, based on past evidence that positive mood motivates self-protective attributions for success and failure and increases the avoidance of negative feedback, recent research has focused on mood as an antecedent to self-handicapping; expecting positive mood to increase self-handicapping behaviour. Results have shown that people who are in positive mood are more likely to engage in self-handicapping, even at the cost of jeopardizing future performance.

Research suggests that among those who self-handicap, self-imposed obstacles may relieve the pressure of a performance and allow one to become more engaged in a task. While this may enhance performance in some situations for some individuals, in general, research indicates that self-handicapping is negatively associated with performance, self-regulated learning, persistence and intrinsic motivation. Additional long-term costs of self-handicapping include worse health and well-being, more frequent negative moods and higher use of various substances.

Zuckerman and Tsai assessed self-handicapping, well-being, and coping among college students on two occasions over several months. Self-handicapping assessed on the first occasion predicted coping with problems by denial, blaming others and criticizing oneself as well as depression and somatic complaints. Depression and somatic complaints also predicted subsequent self-handicapping. Thus, the use of self-handicapping may lead to not only uncertainty as to one's ability but also ill-being, which in turn may lead to further reliance on self-handicapping.

== Applications ==
There are many real world applications for this concept. For example, if people predict they are going to perform poorly on tasks, they create obstacles, such as taking drugs and consuming alcohol, so that they feel that they have diverted the blame from themselves if they actually do fail. In addition, another way that people self-handicap is by creating already-made excuses just in case they fail. For example, if a student feels that he is going to perform badly on a test, then he might make up an excuse for his potential failure, such as telling his friends that he does not feel well the morning of the test.

=== Occurrence in sports ===
Previous research has suggested that because in Physical Education (PE) students are required to overtly display their physical abilities and incompetence could be readily observed by others, PE is an ideal setting to observe self-handicapping. Because of its prevalence in the sporting world, self-handicapping behaviour has become of interest to sports psychologists who are interested in increasing sports performance. A study published in the year 2017 showed that self-esteem had a negative effect on self-handicapping. They found that when it came to mastery goals there was a positive effect resulting from self-esteem. It also suggested that there was a negative effect on performance-avoidance goals when it came to self-esteem. The findings from this study stipulate that by improving an individual's self-esteem and working towards mastery goals while also lowering the number of performance-avoidance goals present should prove to be pertinent strategies involved in reducing self-handicapping in physical education. Recent research has examined the relationship between behavioural and claimed self-handicaps and athletic performance as well as the effects self-handicapping has on anxiety and fear of failure before athletic performance.

== Controversies ==
One controversy was revealed in a study done at the University of Wyoming. Previous research indicated a negative correlation between self-handicapping behaviors and boosting one's self-esteem; it was also shown that people who focus on the positive attributes of themselves are less likely to self-handicap. This study, however, demonstrates that this claim is only partially accurate because the reduction of self-handicapping is only apparent in an area unrelated to the present self-esteem risk. As a result, the attempt to protect self-esteem becomes a detriment to future success in that area.

== See also ==
- Attributional bias
- Defensive pessimism
- Learned helplessness
- Outline of self
- Self-defeating personality disorder
- Self-perception theory
- Self-serving bias
- Setting up to fail
