= Honour =

Concept of worthiness and respectability

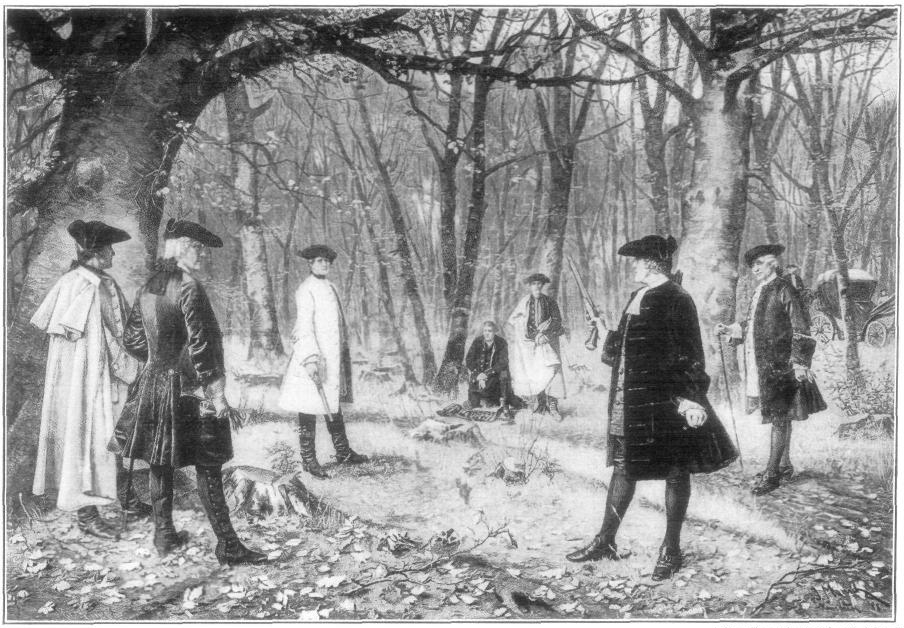
Alexander Hamilton defends his honour by accepting Aaron Burr's challenge (1804). Illustration after painting "Ein Ehrenhandel" by Joseph Munsch (Austrian, 1832–1896)

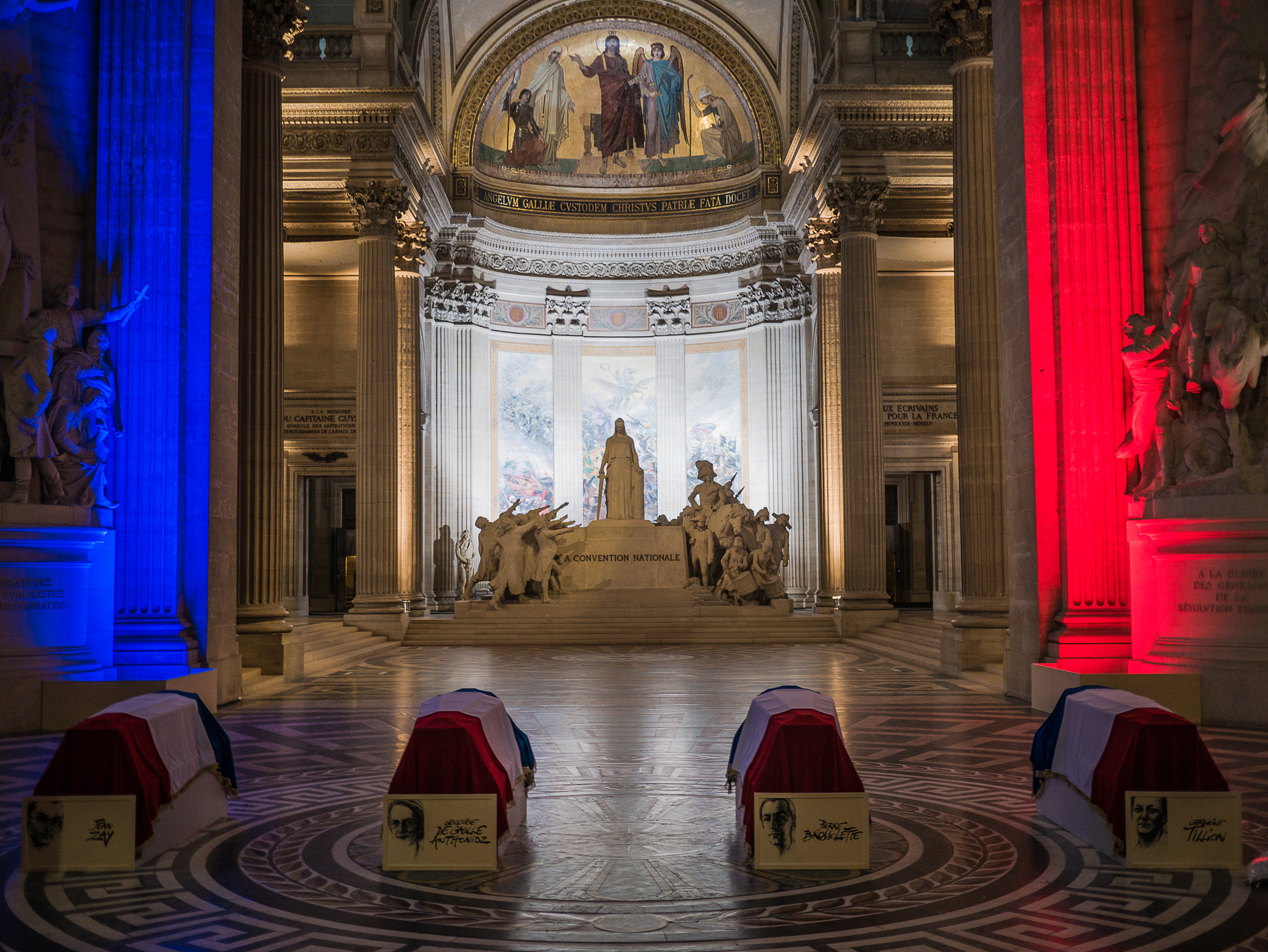
French Resistance members Germaine Tillion, Geneviève de Gaulle-Anthonioz and Pierre Brossolette and politician Jean Zay entering the Panthéon in Paris with national honours, 2015

Honour (Commonwealth English) or honor (American English; see spelling differences) is a quality of a person that is of both social teaching and personal ethos, that manifests itself as a code of conduct, and has various elements such as valour, chivalry, honesty, and compassion. It is an abstract concept entailing a perceived quality of worthiness and respectability that affects both the social standing and the self-evaluation of an individual or of institutions such as a family, school, regiment, or nation. Accordingly, individuals (or institutions) are assigned worth and stature based on the harmony of their actions with a specific code of honour, and with the moral code of the society at large.

Samuel Johnson, in his A Dictionary of the English Language (1755), defined honour as having several senses, the first of which was "nobility of soul, magnanimity, and a scorn of meanness". This sort of honour derives from the perceived virtuous conduct and personal integrity of the person endowed with it. Johnson also defined honour in relationship to "reputation" and "fame"; to "privileges of rank or birth", and as "respect" of the kind which "places an individual socially and determines his right to precedence". This sort of honour is often not so much a function of moral or ethical excellence, as it is a consequence of power. Finally, with respect to sexuality, honour has traditionally been associated with (or identical to) "chastity" or "virginity", or in the case of married men and women, "fidelity".

== Social context ==
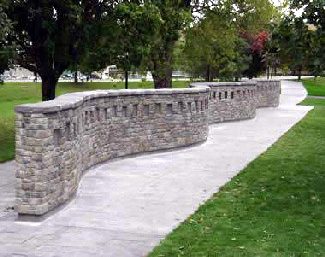
Wall of Honour, Royal Military College of Canada

Honour as a code of behaviour defines the duties of an individual within a social group. Margaret Visser observes that in an honour-based society "a person is what he or she is in the eyes of other people". A code of honour differs from a legal code, also socially defined and concerned with justice, in that honour remains implicit rather than explicit and objectified.

One can distinguish honour from dignity, which Wordsworth assessed as measured against an individual's conscience rather than against the judgement of a community. The sociological concept of face is related to honour.

In the early medieval period, a lord's or lady's honour was the group of manors or lands he or she held. "The word was first used indicating an estate which gave its holder dignity and status." For a person to say "on my honour" was not just an affirmation of their integrity and rank, but the veracity behind that phrase meant he or she was willing to offer up estates as pledge and guarantee.

The concept of honour appears to have declined in importance in the modern West; conscience has replaced it in the individual context, and the rule of law (with the rights and duties defined therein) has taken over in a social context. Popular stereotypes would have it surviving more definitively in more tradition-bound cultures (e.g. Pashtun, Southern Italian, Polish, Persian, Turkish, Arab, Iberian, "Old South" or Dixie) in a perception akin to Orientalism. Pre-modern societies may tend to "honour" more than do contemporary industrial societies. Saint Anselm of Canterbury (c. 1033–1109) in Cur Deus Homo extended the concept of honour from his own feudal society to postulate God's honour.

An emphasis on the importance of honour exists in such traditional institutions as the military (serving officers may conduct a court of honour) and in organisations with a military ethos, such as Scouting organisations (which also feature "Courts of Honour").

Honour in the case of sexuality frequently relates, historically, to fidelity: preservation of "honour" equates primarily to maintenance of the virginity of singles and to the exclusive monogamy of the remainder of the population. Further conceptions of this type of honour vary widely between cultures; some cultures regard honour killings of (mostly female) members of one's own family as justified if the individuals have "defiled the family's honour" by marrying against the family's wishes, usually for reasons such as refusing to enter an arranged marriage, having sex outside marriage, dressing in ways which are deemed inappropriate, or engaging in homosexual relations or even by becoming the victims of rape. Human rights observers generally see these honour killings as a way of men using the culture of honour to control female sexuality. In India in the 2010s, there were honour killings of men from lower castes.

Skinners, executioners, grave-diggers, shepherds, barber-surgeons, millers, linen-weavers, sow-gelders, latrine-cleaners, bailiffs and their families were among the "dishonourable people" (unehrliche Leute) in early modern German society.

== Cultural difference from law ==
Various sociologists and anthropologists have contrasted cultures of honour with cultures of law. A culture of law has a body of laws which all members of society must obey, with punishments for transgressors. This requires a society with the structures required to enact and enforce laws. A culture of law incorporates a social contract: members of society give up some aspects of their freedom to defend themselves and to retaliate for injuries, on the understanding that society will apprehend and punish transgressors.

An alternative to government enforcement of laws is community or individual enforcement of social norms.

One way that honour functions is through reputation. In a system where there is no court that will authorise the use of force to guarantee the execution of contracts, an honourable reputation is very valuable to promote trust among transaction partners. To dishonour an agreement could be economically ruinous, because future potential transaction partners might stop trusting the party not to lie, steal their money or goods, not repay debts, mistreat the children they marry off, have children with other people, abandon their children, or fail to provide aid when needed. A dishonourable person might be shunned by the community as a way to punish bad behaviour and create an incentive for others to maintain their honour.

If one's honour is questioned, it can thus be important to disprove any false accusations or slander. In some cultures, the practice of dueling arose as a means to settle such disputes firmly, though by physical dominance in force or skill rather than by objective consideration of evidence and facts.

Honour can also imply duty to perform certain actions, such as providing for and disciplining one's children, serving in the military during war, contributing to local collective projects like building infrastructure, or exacting revenge in retaliation for acts one is directly harmed by.

=== Family honour ===
The concept of personal honour can be extended to family honour, which strengthens the incentives to follow social norms in two ways. First, the consequences of dishonourable actions (such as suicide or attempted robbery that results in death) outlive the perpetrator, and negatively affect family members they presumably care about. Second, when one member of the family misbehaves, other members of the family are in the position to and are incentivised to strongly enforce the community norms.

In strong honour cultures, those who do not conform may be forced or pressured into conformance and transgressors punished physically or psychologically. The use of violence may be collective in its character, where many relatives act together. An extreme form of punishment is honour killing. Dueling and vengeance at a family level can result in a sustained feud.

Honour-based cultures are also known as honour-shame cultures and are contrasted with guilt cultures on the guilt-shame-fear spectrum of cultures.

Cultures of honour are often conservative, encoding pre-modern traditional family values and duties. In some cases these values clash with those of post-sexual revolution and egalitarian societies. Cultures of law sometimes consider practices in honour cultures to be unethical or a violation of the legal concept of human rights; for example, they may outlaw vigilante or individual justice-taking.

== Examples ==
Thinkers ranging from Plato to Montesquieu have remarked upon the mindset needed for a culture of honour.

Historians have examined the culture of honour in the American South. Social scientists have looked at specialised subcultures such as South Asian Muslims in Britain. Others have compared multiple modern nations.

From the viewpoint of anthropologists, cultures of honour typically appear among nomadic peoples and among herdsmen who carry their most valuable property with them and risk having it stolen, without having recourse to law enforcement or to government. Due to the lack of strong institutions, cultivating a reputation for swift and disproportionate revenge increases the safety of one's person and property against aggressive actors.

According to Richard Nisbett, cultures of honour will often arise when three conditions exist:

1. a scarcity of resources
2. situations in which the benefit of theft and crime outweighs the risks
3. a lack of sufficient law-enforcement (such as in geographically remote regions)

Historically, cultures of honour exist where the herding of animals dominates an economy. In this situation, the geography is usually extensive, since the soil cannot support intensive sustained farming and thus large populations; the benefit of stealing animals from other herds is high, since animals are the main form of wealth; and there is no central law-enforcement or rule of law. However, cultures of honour can also appear in places like modern inner-city slums. The three conditions exist here as well: lack of resources (poverty); crime and theft have high rewards, compared to the very limited alternatives; and law enforcement is generally lax or corrupt.

Once a culture of honour exists in a society, its members find it difficult to make the transition to a culture of law, which requires that people become willing to back down and refuse to immediately retaliate. From the viewpoint of the culture of honour, the perceived humiliation of such an action makes personal restraint extremely difficult, as it reflects weakness and appeasement.

One paper suggests that present-day Canadian hockey players born in communities that historically lay outside the reach of the Royal Canadian Mounted Police (Mounties) seem to inherit a violent code of honour that drives their sporting behaviour.

== War of 1812 ==
Historian Norman Risjord emphasised the importance of honour as a cause of the War of 1812, which the United States launched against Britain despite Britain's much more powerful naval and military strength. Americans of every political stripe saw the need to uphold national honour, and to reject the treatment of the United States by Britain as a third class nonentity. Americans talked incessantly about the need for force in response. This quest for honour was a major cause of the war in the sense that most Americans who were not involved in mercantile interests or threatened by Native American attack strongly endorsed the preservation of national honour. The humiliating attack by HMS Leopard against USS Chesapeake in June 1807 was a decisive event. Historians documented the importance of honour in shaping public opinion in a number of states, including Massachusetts, Ohio, Pennsylvania, and Tennessee, as well as the territory of Michigan. Americans widely celebrated the conclusion of the war as successful, especially after the spectacular defeat of the main British invasion army at New Orleans restored the American sense of honour.

National honor, the reputation of republican government, and the continuing supremacy of the Republican party had seemed to be at stake... National honor had [now] been satisfied," says historian Lance Banning, "Americans celebrated the end of the struggle with a brilliant burst of national pride."

The British showed respect for American honour. "Some of the strongest praise for America and swiftest recognition of what the young republic had achieved for American honor, prestige, and power came from within British naval circles." Britain refrained from interfering with American maritime interests and ceased with the impressment of American citizens following the war.

=== Predisposition in the United States of America ===
A 2016 study suggests that honour culture increases the risk of war. The study found that international conflicts under U.S. presidents who were raised in the South of the country "are shown to be twice as likely to involve uses of force, last on average twice as long, and are three times more likely to end in victory for the United States than disputes under non-Southern presidents. Other characteristics of Southern presidencies do not seem able to account for this pattern of results."

== See also ==
- Bushido – Moral code of the samurai
- Chivalry – Traditional ideology and code of conduct of knights
- Code duello – Set of rules for a one-on-one combat
- Culture of honor (Southern United States) – Cultural attribute of the southern United States
- Dignitas (Roman concept) – Ancient Roman virtue
- Ethos – Greek word meaning 'character'
- Feud – Long-running argument or fight
- Honorary degree – Academic qualification awarded without usual requirements
- Honor killing – Type of murder
- Honour system – Process of governing without enforcement
- Izzat (Honor) – Cultural concept in the Indian subcontinent
- Kanun – Albanian traditional customary law, with honour as one of its pillars
- Krvna osveta – Law of vendetta among South Slavic peoples
- Moka exchange – Ritualized system of exchange in the Mount Hagen area, Papua New Guinea
- Omertà – Southern Italian code of honor and silence
- Order (distinction) – Visible honour awarded to an individual recipient
- Pashtunwali – Traditional way of life of the Pashtun people
- Potlatch – Gift-giving festival and economic system
- Sportsmanship – Ethos of fairness and enjoyment in sports
- The Lost Honour of Katharina Blum – 1974 novel by Heinrich Böll
- Youxia – Chinese stock character analogous to a knight-errant
