= William Swann =

American psychologist

William B. Swann
- Born: New Jersey
- Education: Gettysburg College; University of Minnesota
- Known for: Self-verification theory Identity fusion Identity negotiation
- Awards: Research Scientist Development Award, National Institute of Mental Health (twice), Distinguished Lifetime Career Award, International Society for Self and Identity, 2016, Career Contribution Award, Society of Personality and Social Psychology, 2018
- Scientific career
- Fields: Social Psychology, Personality psychology
- Workplaces: University of Texas at Austin

William B. Swann (born 1952) is a professor of social and personality psychology at the University of Texas at Austin. He is primarily known for his work on identity, self and self-esteem, but has also done research on relationships, social cognition, group processes, accuracy in person perception and interpersonal expectancy effects. He received his Ph.D. in 1978 from the University of Minnesota and undergraduate degree from Gettysburg College.

== Research ==
=== Self-verification theory ===
Swann devised self-verification theory, which focuses on people's desire to be known and understood by others. Once people develop firmly held beliefs about themselves, the theory suggests that they will come to prefer that others see them as they see themselves—even if their self-views are negative. Swann and his colleagues have found this tendency in many experiments. For example, married people with negative self-views are more committed to the relationship and less likely to divorce if their spouse views them negatively. Recent research has applied this theory to understanding phenomena ranging from reactions to procedural justice in organizations, the productivity of members of work groups and teams, and extreme group behavior, such as fighting for one's group.

There is a tension between self-enhancement (the drive for a positive self-image) and self-verification, which reinforces even the negative aspects of a self-image. Swann and colleagues have found that emotional reactions favor enhancement, while more thoughtful processes favor verification. They also found that people are more likely to seek enhancement early on in a relationship, but verification as the relationship develops.

=== Identity negotiation ===
More recently Swann has contributed to identity negotiation theory. Identity negotiation refers to the processes whereby people in relationships reach agreements regarding "who is who." Once reached, these agreements govern what people expect of one another and the way they relate to one another. As such, identity negotiation processes provide the interpersonal "glue" that holds relationships together. Identity negotiation theory has been used to examine how people work or study together in groups, especially the role of diversity.

=== Identity fusion ===
Identity fusion is a visceral sense of "oneness" with a group and its individual members that motivates personally costly, pro-group behaviors. Past approaches, most notably social identity theory, have assumed that when people align with groups they are bound to the group by collective ties to the group category. Fusion theory emphasizes the ways in which alignment to groups can be based on fit with the personal self and attachment to other group members. Strongly fused persons are especially inclined to endorse pro-group action when either the personal or the social self is salient, when physiological arousal is high, or when they perceive that group members share essential qualities (e.g., genes, core values) with one another. Moreover, feelings of personal agency, perceptions of family-like ties to other group members, and a sense of group-related invulnerability mediate the link between identity fusion and pro-group behaviors. All of these effects emerge while controlling for identification, which predicted extreme sacrifice for the group weakly if at all. Moreover, identity fusion is associated with actual extreme behaviors, such as willingness to volunteer for front-line duty among Libyans during the 2011 revolution. By specifying some of the key antecedents of extreme pro-group behavior as well as the role of the personal self and relational, family like ties in such behavior, the identity-fusion approach fills an important explanatory gap left largely unaddressed by earlier perspectives on group processes.

== Academic service ==
Swann was the 2010 President of the Society of Experimental Social Psychology.
