= Self-assessment =

Concept in social psychology

In social psychology, self-assessment is the process of looking at oneself in order to assess aspects that are important to one's identity. It is one of the motives that drive self-evaluation, along with self-verification and self-enhancement. Sedikides (1993) suggests that the self-assessment motive will prompt people to seek information to confirm their uncertain self-concept rather than their certain self-concept and at the same time people use self-assessment to enhance their certainty of their own self-knowledge. However, the self-assessment motive could be seen as quite different from the other two self-evaluation motives. Unlike the other two motives, through self-assessment people are interested in the accuracy of their current self view, rather than improving their self-view. This makes self-assessment the only self-evaluative motive that may cause a person's self-esteem to be damaged.

== Functions ==
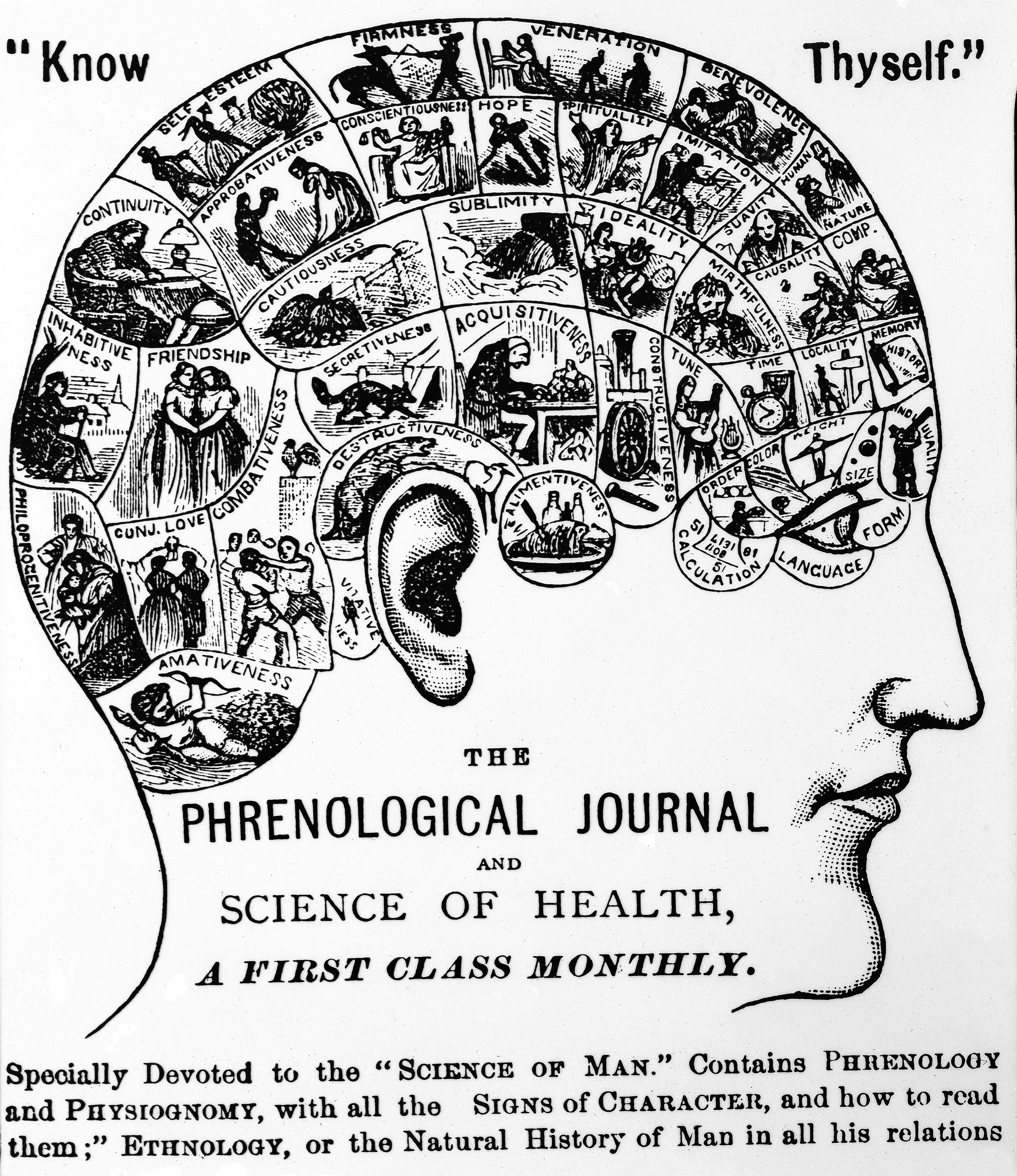
An early example of the process of self-assessment

If through self-assessing there is a possibility that a person's self-concept, or self-esteem is going to be damaged why would this be a motive of self-evaluation, surely it would be better to only self-verify and self-enhance and not to risk damaging self-esteem? Trope in a 1986 paper suggests that self-assessment is a way in which self-esteem can be enhanced in the future. For example, self-assessment may mean that in the short-term self-assessment may cause harm to a person's self-concept through realising that they may not have achieved as highly as they may like; however in the long term this may mean that they work harder in order to achieve greater things in the future, and as a result their self-esteem would be enhanced further than where it had been before self-assessment.

Within the self-evaluation motives however there are some interesting interactions. Self-assessment is found a lot of the time to be associated with self-enhancement as the two motives seem to contradict each other with opposing aims; whereas the motive to self-assess sees it as important to ensure that the self-concept is accurate the motive to self-enhance sees it as important to boost the self-concept in order to protect it from any negative feedback.

== Research ==
In 1993, Constantine Sedikides performed an experiment investigating the roles of each of the self-evaluation motives, investigated if one was stronger and held more weight than others and tried to draw out specifically the self-assessment and self-verification motives. The first experiment conducted the results showed that when choosing what questions they wanted to be asked they were more likely to request those that would verify their self-concept rather than assess it. This finding supports the idea that certain traits are more central to a person's self-concept, however shows little support for the self-assessment motive. When considering the interaction between how strong and how central certain traits are to a person's self-concept Sedikides again found evidence in support of the self-verification and self-enhancement motives, though again none for the self-assessment motive.

The second experiment conducted by Sedikides (1993) investigated the possibility that the ability for greater reflection than experiment one may show greater levels of self-assessment in the participants. However the results of this experiment showed that though through some analysis there was evidence of some self-verification there was no real evidence pointing towards self-assessment and all the results supported self-enhancement. The third experiment again tried to draw out evidence for self-verification and self-assessment and though, as with experiment two, there was some evidence to support the self-verification motive most of the results pointed towards the self-enhancement method and not self-assessment.

In experiment four Sedikides suggests that the reason past experiments have not supported self-assessment is because participants reflect more on the central traits than peripheral traits, which are generally ones that are assessed so as to be able to improve at the same time as not harming the self-concept too much. This experiment therefore looked at whether this was true and whether it was the central traits that were being looked at in this study rather than peripheral. The results showed exactly what Sedikides expected, though because of this the results of the other parts of the experiment gave support to the self-enhancement motive rather than self-assessment of self-verification.

The fifth experiment carried out by Sedikides suggests that in the past experiments the possibility of self-assessing was less likely than self-verification or self-enhancement as the participants would not have been objective in their self-evaluation. For this experiment therefore the experimental group were asked to approach their reflections in an objective way, as if they were approaching their self-concept as a scientist, bringing each of their traits under scrutiny. Results of this study showed that those subjects who were asked to be objective in their assessment strove more for accuracy than those not asked to be specifically objective. The authors then conducted one final experiment looking at the validation of self-enhancement when reflecting on the self.

Sedikides and Strube (1997) reviewed past research into the self-assessment motive and looked at whether participants would be more attracted to tasks that were high or low in accuracy about their characteristics, whether they would choose to take part in tasks that were more or less accurate and if they would prefer to create highly or less accurate tasks. This review showed that people are more attracted to taking part in tasks that are more accurate about them than those that are less accurate and would prefer to take part in higher accuracy tests. However, when only being asked if they would like to take part in high or low accuracy tasks does not give a complete accurate view of self-assessment; if there is no threat of actually taking part in the tasks the participants may not be as honest as if they actually had to take part. Brown therefore showed that self-assessment is can be seen when participants are asked to actually take part in tasks that will be high in their accuracy or low in their accuracy of a person's characteristics. This research found that participants were more likely to choose to take part in tasks that were higher in accuracy about their characteristics. The last area of self-assessment Sedikides and Strube reviewed was whether participants would want to construct highly or less accurate tasks and if participants would be more persistent or more likely to succeed if they were taking part in highly or less accurate tasks. The review showed that participants would prefer to make highly accurate tasks which measured their abilities; however they will be more persistent in tasks which are lower in accuracy. The review also showed though that participants were more likely to succeed on tasks that they were told were high in accuracy. It is suggested that this is because when completing tasks that are highly accurate about a person's characteristics there is more to gain from succeeding in a task as it will therefore give more information about the person's characteristics than if it was low in accuracy.

Though self-assessment is one of the self-evaluation motives it could be suggested that it may not be the most popular one. Self-enhancement was displayed in each of the experiments conducted by Sedikides and self-assessment, and even self-verification to an extent was only displayed when it was teased out. This is not to say that self-assessment is not a self-evaluation motive, however most of the experiments conducted by Sedikides ended up with the participants reflecting on central traits rather than peripheral traits. This is unsurprising as they are the most important traits to a person's self-concept, however it is not therefore surprising that these are the traits that are enhanced rather than assessed as if someone assessed their central traits and found fault it would be more of an issue than finding a fault with a peripheral trait. The fifth experiment carried out by Sedikides shows that self-assessment does exist and is one of the self-evaluation motives; if people didn't self-assess then even in this experiment there would have been no difference between the reflections of those asked to be objective and those who were not. Self-assessment is a difficult motive to assess, as discovered by Sedikides but it is important to self-evaluation as it means that people are able to realize ways in which to improve themselves.

== See also ==
- Knowledge survey
- Outline of self – Overview of and topical guide to self
- Team building – Term for activities used to enhance social relations and define roles within teams
- Self-evaluation maintenance theory – Concept in social psychology
- Self-evaluation motives
