= Identity negotiation =

Sociological identity understanding process

Identity negotiation refers to the processes through which people reach agreements regarding "who is who" in their relationships. Once these agreements are reached, people are expected to remain faithful to the identities they have agreed to assume. The process of identity negotiation thus establishes what people can expect of one another. Identity negotiation thus provides the interpersonal "glue" that holds relationships together.

The idea that identities are negotiated originated in the sociological literature during the middle of the 20th century. A leading figure in this movement was Goffman (1959, 1961), who asserted that the first order of business in social interaction is establishing a "working consensus" or agreement regarding the roles each person will assume in the interaction. Weinstein and Deutschberger (1964), and later McCall and Simmons (1966), built on this work by elaborating the interpersonal processes that unfold after interaction partners reach an initial working consensus. Within psychology, these ideas were elaborated by Secord and Backman (1965) and Schlenker (1985). The actual phrase "identity negotiation" was introduced by Swann (1987), who emphasized the tension between two competing processes in social interaction, behavioral confirmation and self-verification. Behavioral confirmation occurs when one person (the "perceiver") encourages another person (the "target") to behave in ways that confirm the expectancies of the perceiver (e.g., Rosenthal & Jacobson, 1968; Snyder & Klein, 2005; Snyder, Tanke, & Berscheid, 1977). Self-verification occurs when the "target" persuades the "perceiver" to behave in a manner that verifies the target's firmly held self-views or identities (Swann, 1983; 1996).

== Psychological view ==
When the expectancies of perceivers clash with the self-views of targets, a "battle of wills" may occur (Swann & Ely, 1984). Such "battles" can range from short-lived, mild disagreements that are quickly and easily solved to highly pitched confrontations that are combative and contentious. On such occasions, the identity negotiation process represents the means through which these conflicting tendencies are reconciled.

More often than not, the identity negotiation process seems to favor self-verification, which means that people tend to develop expectancies that are congruent with the self-views of target persons (e.g., Major, Cozzarelli, Testa, & McFarlin, 1988); McNulty & Swann, 1994; Swann, Milton, & Polzer, 2000; Swann & Ely, 1984). Such congruence is personally adaptive for targets because it allows them to maintain stable identities and having stable identities is generally adaptive. That is, stable identities not only tell people how to behave, they also afford people with a sense of psychological coherence that reinforces their conviction that they know what to do and the consequences of doing it.

Groups also benefit when there is congruence among group members. When people maintain stable images of themselves, other members of the organization can count on them to "be" the same person day in and day out and the identity negotiation process can unfold automatically. This may free people to devote their conscious attention to the work at hand, which may explain why researchers have found that groups characterized by high levels of congruence perform better (Swann et al., 2000). Also, just as demographic diversity tends to undermine group performance when congruence is low, diversity improves performance when congruence is high (Polzer, Milton, & Swann, 2003; Swann, Polzer, Seyle, & Ko, 2004).

Some instances of incongruence in relationships are inevitable. Sudden or unanticipated changes of status or role of one person, or even the introduction of a novel person into a group, may produce discrepancies between people's self-views and the expectancies of others. In work settings, promotions can foment expectancy violations (cf, Burgoon, 1978) if some members of the organization refuse to update their appraisals of the recently promoted person. When incongruence occurs, it will disturb the normal flow of social interaction. Instead of going about their routine tasks, interaction partners will be compelled to shift their conscious attention to the task of accommodating the identity change that is the source of the disruption. Frequent or difficult-to-resolve disruptions could be damaging to the quality of social interactions and ultimately interfere with relationship quality, satisfaction and productivity.

== See also ==
- Erving Goffman
- Face negotiation theory
- Self-verification theory
- Symbolic interactionism
- William Swann
- Wishful identification
