= Self-enhancement =

Type of motivation

Self-enhancement is a type of motivation that works to make people feel good about themselves and to maintain self-esteem. This motive becomes especially prominent in situations of threat, failure or blows to one's self-esteem. Self-enhancement involves a preference for positive over negative self-views. It is one of the three self-evaluation motives along with self-assessment (the drive for an accurate self-concept) and self-verification (the drive for a self-concept congruent with one's identity). Self-evaluation motives drive the process of self-regulation, that is, how people control and direct their own actions.

There are a variety of strategies that people can use to enhance their sense of personal worth. For example, they can downplay skills that they lack or they can criticise others to seem better by comparison. These strategies are successful, in that people tend to think of themselves as having more positive qualities and fewer negative qualities than others. Although self-enhancement is seen in people with low self-esteem as well as with high self-esteem, these two groups tend to use different strategies. People who already have high esteem enhance their self-concept directly, by processing new information in a biased way. People with low self-esteem use more indirect strategies, for example by avoiding situations in which their negative qualities will be noticeable.

There are controversies over whether or not self-enhancement is beneficial to the individual, and over whether self-enhancement is culturally universal or specific to Western individualism.

== Levels ==
Self-enhancement can occur in many different situations and under many different guises. The general motive of self-enhancement can have many differing underlying explanations, each of which becomes more or less dominant depending on the situation.

The explanations of the self-enhancement motive can occur in different combinations. Self-enhancement can occur as an underlying motive or personality trait without occurring as an observed effect.

Levels of self-enhancement
- Observed effect: Self-enhancement at the level of an observed effect describes the product of the motive. For example, self-enhancement can produce inflated self-ratings (positive illusions). Such ratings would be self-enhancement manifested as an observed effect. It is an observable instance of the motive.
- Ongoing process: Self-enhancement at the level of an ongoing process describes the actual operation of the motive. For example, self-enhancement can result in attributing favourable outcomes to the self and unfavourable outcomes to others (self-serving attribution bias). The actual act of attributing such ratings would be self-enhancement manifested as an ongoing process. It is the motive in operation.
- Personality trait: Self-enhancement at the level of a personality trait describes habitual or inadvertent self-enhancement. For example, self-enhancement can cause situations to be created to ease the pain of failure (self-handicapping). The fabrication of such situations or excuses frequently and without awareness would be self-enhancement manifested as a personality trait. It is the repetitive inclination to demonstrate the motive.
- Underlying motive: Self-enhancement at the level of an underlying motive describes the conscious desire to self-enhance. For example, self-enhancement can cause the comparison of the self to a worse other, making the self seem greater in comparison (strategic social comparisons). The act of comparing intentionally to achieve superiority would be self-enhancement manifested as an underlying motive. It is the genuine desire to see the self as superior.
- The four levels of self-enhancement manifestation as defined by Sedikides & Gregg (2008)

Both the extent and the type of self-enhancement vary across a number of dimensions.

=== Self-advancement vs. self-protection ===
Self-enhancement can occur by either self-advancing or self-protecting, that is either by enhancing the positivity of one's self-concept, or by reducing the negativity of one's self-concept. Self-protection appears to be the stronger of the two motives, given that avoiding negativity is of greater importance than encouraging positivity. However, as with all motivations, there are differences between individuals. For example, people with higher self-esteem appear to favour self-advancement, whereas people with lower self-esteem tend to self-protect. This highlights the role of risk: to not defend oneself against negativity in favour of self-promotion offers the potential for losses, whereas whilst one may not gain outright from self-protection, one does not incur the negativity either. People high in self-esteem tend to be greater risk takers and therefore opt for the more risky strategy of self-advancement, whereas those low in self-esteem and risk-taking hedge their bets with self-protection.

=== Public vs. private ===
Self-enhancement can occur in private or in public. Public self-enhancement is obvious positive self-presentation, whereas private self enhancement is unnoticeable except to the individual. The presence of other people i.e. in public self-enhancement, can either augment or inhibit self-enhancement. Whilst self-enhancement may not always take place in public it is nevertheless still influenced by the social world, for example via social comparisons.

=== Central vs. peripheral ===
Potential areas of self-enhancement differ in terms how important, or central, they are to a person. Self-enhancement tends to occur more in the domains that are the most important to a person, and less in more peripheral, less important domains.

=== Candid vs. tactical ===
Self-enhancement can occur either candidly or tactically. Candid self-enhancement serves the purpose of immediate gratification whereas tactical self-enhancement can result in potentially larger benefits from delayed gratification.

Tactical self-enhancement is often preferred over candid self-enhancement as overt self-enhancement is socially displeasing for those around it. Narcissism is an exemplification of extreme candid self-enhancement.

== Types ==
Self-enhancement does not just occur at random. Its incidence is often highly systematic and can occur in any number of ways in order to achieve its goal of inflating perceptions of the self. Importantly, we are typically unaware that we are self-enhancing. Awareness of self-enhancing processes would highlight the facade we are trying to create, revealing that the self we perceive is in fact an enhanced version of our actual self.

=== Self-serving attribution bias ===
Self-enhancement can also affect the causal explanations people generate for social outcomes. People have a tendency to exhibit a self-serving attribution bias, that is to attribute positive outcomes to one's internal disposition but negative outcomes to factors beyond one's control e.g. others, chance or circumstance. In short, people claim credit for their successes but deny responsibilities for their failures. The self-serving attribution bias is very robust, occurring in public as well as in private, even when a premium is placed on honesty. People most commonly manifest a self-serving bias when they explain the origin or events in which they personally had a hand or a stake.

Explanations for moral transgressions follow similar self-serving patterns, as do explanations for group behaviour. The ultimate attribution error is the tendency to regard negative acts by one's out-group and positive acts by one's in-group as essential to their nature i.e. attributable to their internal disposition and not a product of external factors. This may reflect the operation of the self-serving bias refracted through social identification.

=== Selectivity ===
==== Selective memory ====
Selectivity within information processing
- Selective attention: People typically avoid attending to negative, unflattering information at encoding, therefore its initial recognition is impaired. Selective attention manifests itself in the form of an overt behaviour via selective exposure.
- Selective exposure: People selectively expose themselves to information that justifies important prior decisions they have made. This holds true so long as the information appears to be valid and the decision that was made was done so freely and is irreversible.
- Selective recall: At retrieval people bring to mind a highly biased collection of memories. Selective recall occurs for behaviours that exemplify desirable personality traits, harmonious interpersonal relationships or even health enhancing habits. Affect associated with unpleasant memories also fades faster than affect associated with pleasant memories.

People sometimes self-enhance by selectively remembering their strengths rather than weaknesses. This pattern of selective forgetting has been described as mnemic neglect. Mnemic neglect may reflect biases in the processing of information at either encoding, retrieval or retention.

- Biases at encoding occur via selective attention and selective exposure.
- Biases at retrieval and retention occur via selective recall.

The role of mnemic neglect can be emphasised or reduced by the characteristics of a certain behaviour or trait. For example, after receiving false feedback pertaining to a variety of behaviours, participants recalled more positive behaviours than negative ones, but only when the behaviours exemplified central not peripheral traits and only when feedback pertained to the self and not to others. Similar findings emerge when the to-be-recalled information is personality traits, relationship promoting or undermining behaviours, frequencies of social acts, and autobiographical memories.

==== Selective acceptance and refutation ====
Selective acceptance involves taking as fact self-flattering or ego-enhancing information with little regard for its validity. Selective refutation involves searching for plausible theories that enable criticism to be discredited. A good example of selective acceptance and refutation in action would be: Selective acceptance is the act of accepting as valid an examination on which one has performed well without consideration of alternatives, whereas selective refutation would be mindfully searching for reasons to reject as invalid an examination on which one has performed poorly.

Concordant with selective acceptance and refutation is the observation that people hold a more critical attitude towards blame placed upon them, but a more lenient attitude to praise that they receive. People will strongly contest uncongenial information but readily accept at without question congenial information.

=== Strategies ===
==== Strategic social comparisons ====
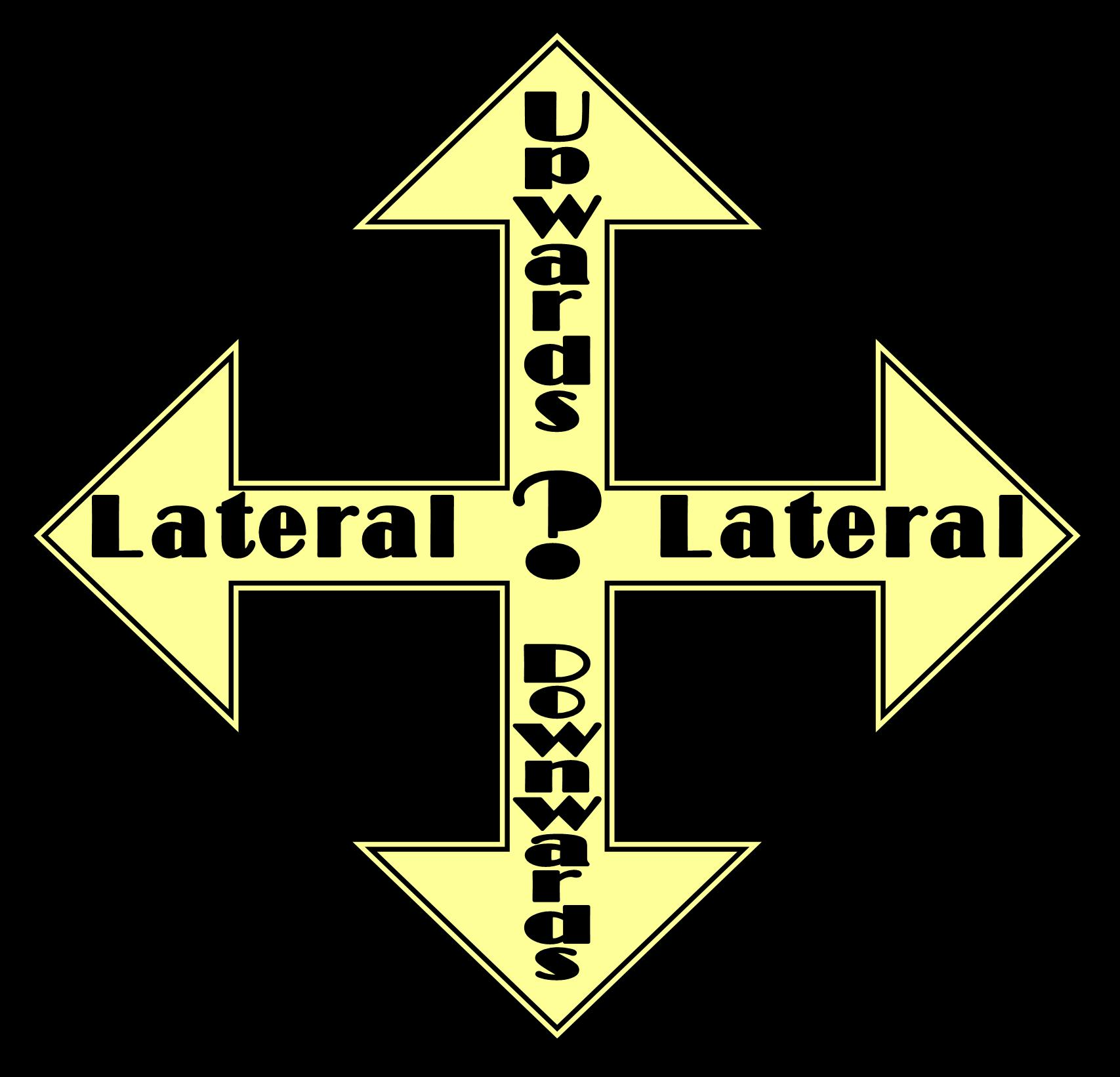
The potential directions for strategic social comparisons

The social nature of the world we live in means that self-evaluation cannot take place in an absolute nature – comparison to other social beings is inevitable. Many social comparisons occur automatically as a consequence of circumstance, for example within an exam sitting social comparisons of intellect may occur to those sitting the same exam. However, the strength of the self-enhancement motive can cause the subjective exploitation of scenarios in order to give a more favourable outcome to the self in comparisons between the self and others. Such involuntary social comparisons prompt self-regulatory strategies.

Self-esteem moderates the beneficial, evaluative consequences of comparisons to both inferior and superior others. People with higher self-esteem are more optimistic about both evading the failures and misfortunes of their inferiors and about securing the successes and good fortunes of their superiors.

===== Upward social comparisons =====
An upwards social comparison involves comparing oneself to an individual perceived to be superior to or better than oneself. Upwards social comparison towards someone felt to be similar to oneself can induce self-enhancement through assimilation of the self and other's characteristics, however this only occurs when:

- The gap between the self and the comparison target is not too large;
- The skill or success being compared is attainable;
- The comparison target is perceived as a competitor.

Where assimilation does not occur as a result of a social comparison, contrast can instead occur which can lead to upwards social comparisons providing inspiration.

===== Downward social comparisons =====
Even though upwards social comparisons are the most common social comparisons, people do sometimes make downwards social comparisons. Downwards social comparisons involve comparing oneself to an individual perceived to be inferior to or less skilled than the self. Downwards social comparisons serve as a form of ego-defence whereby the ego is inflated due to the sense of superiority gained from such downwards social comparisons.

===== Lateral social comparisons =====
Lateral social comparisons, comparisons against those perceived as equal to the self, can also be self-enhancing. Comparisons with members of one's in-group can lead to being protective against low self-esteem, especially when the in-group are disadvantaged.

===== Self-evaluation maintenance theory =====
Self-enhancement waxes and wanes as a function of one's ability level in the context of interpersonal relationships, and this, in turn influences interpersonal attitudes and behaviours. Three factors influence the self-evaluations people make:

- Closeness of a relationship: comparison of one's own performance with that of another is more likely to occur, and when it does is more consequential when others are close rather than distant.
- Personal relevance of a particular ability: when the domain is not relevant to oneself reflection will occur and when the domain is relevant comparison will occur.
  - Reflection: one will undergo self-enhancement (pride) when the other does well, but self-derogation (shame) when the other does poorly.
  - Comparison: one will undergo self-derogation (humiliation) if others perform well, but self-enhancement (triumph) if the other performs poorly.
- Level of performance in that ability domain.

People adopt a variety of coping strategies to deal with the pressures of self-evaluation:

- Choose friends and partners who excel, but not in the same domains as they do;
- Withhold information that is likely to improve the performance of others of personally relevant domains;
- Alter the relevance of performance domains by changing their self-concept, thus moderating the impact of the reflection and comparison processes;
- Broaden or narrow the gap between the oneself and others, even by deliberately altering the difficulty of domain-relevant tasks.

==== Strategic construal ====
The concepts that people use to understand themselves and their social world are relatively vague. Consequently, when making social comparisons or estimations people can easily and subtly shift their construal of the meaning of those concepts in order to self-enhance. Strategic construals typically increase following negative feedback. Numerous examples of strategic construals exist, a small selection include:

- People's interpretation of what counts as a virtue or talent is biased in favour of the attributes they possess, and of what counts as a vice or deficiency in favour of attributes they lack.
- People rate personality feedback and scientific research as less credible if it implies they are susceptible to disease.
- Lazy people perceive the rest of the world as reasonably fit and healthy, whereas frequent exercisers see their athleticism as a single, unique attribute.
- Low achievers in a particular area are likely to perceive the successes of high achievers as exceptional, thereby lessening the shame of their own inability.
- People think harder about any discouraging test results they receive, will spend longer thinking about them, are more inclined to have them confirmed and are significantly more skeptical of them. People do not react the same way to test results received by others however.
- When research tarnishes the reputation of groups with which people identify, they search for a statistical weakness of that research.
- Strategic construals can also be more subtle. People make self-aggrandizing interpretations not only of their own attributes, but also of others in order to appear greater by comparison.

Strategic construals appear to operate around one's self-esteem. After either positive or negative feedback people with high self-esteem alter their perceptions of others, typically varying their perceptions of others ability and performance in a self-enhancing direction. Those with low self-esteem however do not. Self-esteem level appears to moderate the use of strategic construals. As well as operating as a function of self-esteem level, strategic construals also appear to protect self-esteem levels. For example, members of minority groups who perform poorly in academic settings due to negative cultural attitudes towards them, subsequently disengage psychologically from, and dissidentify with academic pursuits in general. Whilst buffering their self-esteem level they jeopardise their future socioeconomic prospects.

Strategic construals also influence the degree to which categories are believed to characterise other people. There is a general tendency to assume that others share one's own characteristics. Nevertheless, people reliably overestimate the prevalence of their shortcomings e.g. show enhanced false consensus effect, and underestimate the prevalence of their strengths e.g. show a contrary false uniqueness effect. People perceive their flaws as relatively commonplace but their skills as unique.

=== Behavioural self-handicapping ===
Behavioural self-handicapping is the act of erecting obstacles in the path of task success in order to reduce the evaluative implications that can be drawn from task performance. This permits self-enhancement to occur in two ways:

- In the case of failure, self-handicapping can protect self-esteem by attributing failure to obstacles that one has erected – discounting.
- In the case of success, self-handicapping can promote self-esteem by attributing success to oneself despite the obstacles one has erected – augmenting.

People low in self-esteem opt for discounting as a self-protective route to avoid being perceived as incompetent, whereas people high in self-esteem preferentially select augmenting as a method of self-promotion to enhance their perceived competence. Self-handicapping, whilst predominantly a behaviour that occurs in private performance is magnified in public situations. However, self-handicapping is highly risky in social situations. If found out, those who use it face the negative evaluation and criticism of others.

Factors promoting behavioural self-handicapping
Task familiarity	Uncertainty over ability to obtain a positive outcome due to experience of limited control over a similar task.
Task complexity	Holding a very fixed, concrete theory of the complexity of a task.
Insecurity	Uncertainty over ability to obtain a positive outcome due to generally insecure sense of self.
Belief	Holding the belief that improvement is physically possible.
Importance	A task or evaluation has to be important to the self in order for self-handicapping to occur.
Feedback	Negative feedback makes self-handicapping more probable as it allows any damage to the ego to be rectified.
Neuroticism	High neuroticism promotes discounting.
Conscientiousness	Low conscientiousness can increase the tendency to self-handicap.

Regardless of the causes of self-handicapping the self-defeating end result remains the same – the integrity and quality of a task outcome or evaluation is compromised in order that the meaning of that outcome appears more agreeable. Behavioural self-handicapping is a good demonstration of active self-deception.

Whilst task performance is important to people, they do sometimes act in ways so as to paradoxically impair task performance, either to protect against the shame of performing poorly by creating a convenient excuse (discounting), or to enhance themselves by succeeding despite adversity by creating grounds for conceit (augmenting). Furthermore, self-handicapping can have unintentional adverse consequences. Whilst allowing the maintenance of positive self-views self-handicapping has the cost of impairing objective performance. Students who report frequent use of self-handicapping strategies underperform relative to their aptitude, with poor examination preparation mediating the effect.

Ultimately, those who readily prepare themselves for the possibility of poor task performance beforehand use the strategy of discounting less.

== Outcomes ==
The effect of self-enhancement strategies is shown in the tendency of people to see themselves as having more positive qualities and a more positive future outlook than others.

=== Self-enhancing triad ===
People generally hold unrealistically positive views about themselves. Such flattering views can often be neatly categorised within what has become known as the Triad of Positive Illusions. The three illusions in question are above-average effect, illusions of control, and unrealistic optimism. These illusions can be replicated across many situations and are highly resistant to revision. Rather ironically, when informed of the existence of such illusions, people generally consider themselves to be less prone to them than others.

==== Above-average effect ====
The better-than-average-effect is the most common demonstration of an above-average effect. It is a highly robust effect, as evidenced by the fact that even when the criteria on which the self and others are judged are identical the self is still perceived more favourably. Things close to the self also take on the perceived superiority of the above-average effect. People value both their close relationships and their personal possessions above those of others. However, where an outcome is perceived as highly skilled, people often err on the side of caution and display a worse-than-average effect. The majority of people would rate themselves as below average in unicycling ability, for example.

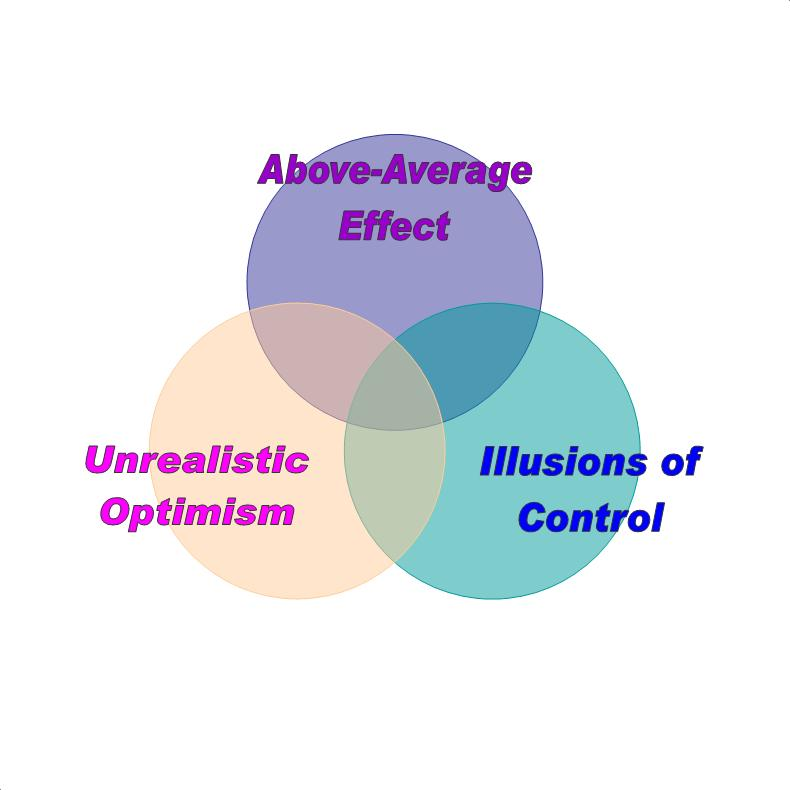
The three related divisions of the self-enhancing triad

The illusory nature of the above-average effect comes from the fact that not everyone can be above-average – otherwise the average would not be the average! The majority of people rating themselves as being better than the majority of people does not quite seem plausible, and in some situations is 100% impossible. Where a distribution is symmetrical i.e. mean = median = mode, it is statistically impossible for the majority of people to be above average, as whichever of the three averages is taken, all are equal to the 50th percentile. In a non-symmetrical distribution i.e. mean < median < mode or mode < median < mean, it is statistically impossible for the majority of people to be above average when the average is taken to be the median, as the median represents the 50th percentile, or the midpoint of the data. However, in a non-symmetrical distribution where the average is taken to be either the mean or the mode, the above-average effect can be statistically plausible. In some situations the majority of people can be above-average.

People show self-enhancement in the form of the above-average effect in many different ways. It is typical for people to profess to be above-average at a task yielding positive or desirable outcomes, and below average at a task yielding negative or undesirable outcomes.

Some of the wide variety of documented examples of the above-average effect include observations that:

- Most university students regard themselves as well above the 50th percentile in exhibiting social grace, athletic prowess and leadership abilities.
- Even 12th percentile achievers in domains such as grammar and logic consider themselves to be of 62nd percentile achievement.
- 94% of university professors believe their teaching ability to be above average.
- University students in the UK and the US regard themselves as above average drivers. Even drivers hospitalised after causing accidents persist in believing they are no worse than regular drivers.
- Employees routinely overstate their level of professional knowledge by 20% compared to that of their coworkers.
- Even when informed about the above average effect people rate themselves as less susceptible to such biases than others.

==== Illusions of control ====
People overestimate the level of control they have over outcomes and contingencies, seeing their actions as influential even when they are in fact inconsequential. Also, people stand by their apparent conviction that they can influence the outcomes of inherently random systems for example lotteries, especially when such systems possess features typically associated with skill-based tasks. Even when a degree of contingency does exist between actions and outcomes, people still reliably overestimate the strength of that contingency.

==== Unrealistic optimism ====
People typically believe that their life will hold a greater number of positive experiences and fewer negative experiences than the lives of similar others. They have the same unrealistic optimism, but to a lesser degree, for others who are closely linked, such as romantic partners and close personal friends.

Unrealistic optimism is apparent in people's behaviours and beliefs across many different situations. People can both overestimate their ability to predict the future, and underestimate how long it will take them to complete a variety of tasks. People also overestimate the accuracy of their social predictions, and interpret probability adverbs to award higher values for personal positive outcomes and lower values for personal negative outcomes. Smokers, rather alarmingly, underestimate their risk of cancer relative to both non-smokers and even in comparison with fellow smokers.

=== Benefits and costs to the individual ===
There is controversy over whether self-enhancement is adaptive or maladaptive. A single operationalisation of self-enhancement can be influenced by a variety of motives and thus can be coordinated with both positive and negative outcomes. Those who misperceive their performance (self-enhancers and self-effacers) tend to have a lower academic achievement, lower subsequent performance. These results appear to be culturally universal. Surely, it's a false assumption to relate self enhancement to depression.

- If self-enhancement is taken to mean rendering more positive judgments of oneself than of others then outcomes are frequently favourable.
- If self-enhancement is taken to mean the rendering of more positive judgements of oneself than others render then outcomes are often untoward.

Which definition is better at measuring self-enhancement has been disputed, as rating oneself more positively than one rates others is not seen as self-enhancement by some researchers.

In some studies, self-enhancement has been shown to have strong positive links with good mental health and in others with bad mental health. Self-enhancing can also have social costs. Whilst promoting resilience amongst survivors of the September 11th terrorist attacks, those who self-enhanced were rated as having decreased social adaptation and honesty by friends and family.

== Constraints ==
=== Plausibility ===
Self-enhancement thrives upon the vagueness or ambiguity of evidence. Where criteria are rigidly defined, self-enhancement typically reduces. For example, the above-average effect decreases as clarity and definition of the defined trait increases. The easier it is to verify a behaviour or trait, the less that trait will be subject to self-enhancement. The plausibility of a trait or characteristic given real world evidence moderates the degree to which the self-enhancement of that trait occurs. Selectively recalling instances of desirable traits is moderated by one's actual standing on those traits in reality.

When plausibility reduces the impact of self-enhancement, undesirable evidence often has to be accepted, albeit reluctantly. This typically occurs when all possible interpretations of the evidence in question have been made. The reason for this unwilling acceptance is to maintain effective social functioning, where unqualified self-aggrandizement would otherwise prevent it. People will continue to self-enhance so long as they think they can get away with it.

The constraint of plausibility on self enhancement exists because self-enhancing biases cannot be exploited. Self-enhancement works only under the assumption of rationality – to admit to self-enhancing totally undermines any conclusions one can draw and any possibility of believing its facade, since according to legit rational processes it functions as a genuinely verifiable and accredited improvement.

=== Mood ===
Both positive and negative moods can reduce the presence of the self-enhancement motive. The effects of mood on self-enhancement can be explained by a negative mood making the use of self-enhancing tactics harder, and a positive mood making their use less necessary in the first place.

The onset of a positive mood can make people more receptive to negative diagnostic feedback. Past successes are reviewed with expectation of receiving such positive feedback, presumably to buffer their mood.

Depression has quite a well-evidenced link with a decrease in the motive to self-enhance. Depressives are less able to self-enhance in response to negative feedback than non-depressive controls. Having a depressive disposition decreases the discrepancy between one's own estimates of one's virtues and the estimates of a neutral observer, namely by increasing modesty. Illusions of control are moderated by melancholy. However, whilst the self-ratings of depressives are more in line with those of neutral observers than the self ratings of normals, the self ratings of normals are more in line with those of friends and family than the self ratings of depressives.

=== Social context and relationships ===
The presence of the motive to self-enhance is dependent on many social situations, and the relationships shared with the people in them. Many different materialisations of self-enhancement can occur depending on such social contexts:

- The self-enhancement motive is weaker during interactions with close and significant others.
- When friends (or previous strangers whose intimacy levels have been enhanced) cooperate on a task, they do not exhibit a self-serving attribution bias.
  - Casual acquaintances and true strangers however do exhibit a self-serving attribution bias.
  - Where no self-serving bias is exhibited in a relationship, a betrayal of trust in the relationship will reinstate the self-serving bias. This corresponds to findings that relationship satisfaction is inversely correlated with the betrayal of trust.
- Both mutual liking and expectation of reciprocity appear to mediate graciousness in the presence of others.
- Whilst people have a tendency to self-present boastfully in front of strangers, this inclination disappears in the presence of friends.
- Others close to the self are generally more highly evaluated than more distant others.

=== Culture ===
Psychological functioning is moderated by the influence of culture. There is much evidence to support a culture-specific view of self-enhancement.

Westerners typically...	Easterners typically...
Prioritise intradependence	Prioritise interdependence
Place greater importance on individualistic values	Place greater importance on collectivistic values
Have more inflated ratings of their own merits	Have less inflated ratings of their own merits
Emphasise internal attributes	Emphasise relational attributes
Show self-enhancement that overshadows self-criticism	Show self-criticism that overshadows self-enhancement
Give spontaneously more positive self-descriptions	Give spontaneously more negative self-descriptions
Make fewer self-deprecatory social comparisons	Make more self-deprecatory social comparisons
Hold more unrealistically optimistic views of the future	Hold fewer unrealistically optimistic views of the future
Display a self-serving attributional bias	Do not display a self-serving attributional bias
Show a weak desire to self-improve via self-criticism	Show a strong desire to self-improve via self-criticism
Are eager to conclude better performance than a classmate	Are reluctant to conclude better performance than a classmate
Reflexively discount negative feedback	Readily acknowledge negative feedback
Persist more after initial success	Persist more after initial failure
Consider tasks in which they succeed to be most diagnostic	Consider tasks in which they fail to be most diagnostic
Self-enhance on the majority of personality dimensions	Self-enhance only on some personality dimensions
Self-enhance on individualistic attributes	Self-enhance on collectivist attributes

Self-enhancement appears to be a phenomenon largely limited to Western cultures, where social ties are looser than in the East. This is concordant with empirical evidence highlighting relationship closeness as a constraint on self-enhancement. The self-improvement motive, as an aspiration towards a possible self may also moderate a variety of psychological processes in both independent and interdependent cultures.

There are nevertheless signs that self-enhancement is not completely absent in interdependent cultures. Chinese schoolchildren rate themselves highly on the dimension of competence, and Taiwanese employees rate themselves more favourably than their employers do, both of which show self-enhancing tendencies in Eastern cultures.

One possible explanation for the observed differences in self-enhancement between cultures is that they may occur through differences in how candidly or tactically the motive to self-enhance is acted upon, and not due to variations in the strength of motive. Alternatively, self-enhancement may be represented only in terms of the characteristics that are deemed important by individuals as they strive to fulfil their culturally prescribed roles.

The issue over whether self-enhancement is universal or specific to Western cultures has been contested within modern literature by two researchers — Constantine Sedikides and Steven Heine. Sedikides argues that self-enhancement is universal, and that different cultures self-enhance in domains important in their culture. Heine on the other hand describes self-enhancement as a predominantly Western motive.

=== Other motives ===
It is an exaggeration to say that self-enhancement is the dominant self-evaluation motive. Many controversies exist regarding the distinction between the self-evaluation motives, and there are situations in which motives asides from self-enhancement assume priority.

1. The self-assessment motive is often contrasted with the self-enhancement motive due to the relative adaptiveness of each approach within social interactions.
2. The self-verification motive is often challenged by supporters of the self-enhancement as being unfeasible as it often appears implausible.
3. The self-improvement motive is often taken to be the physical manifestation of the self-enhancement motive i.e. the act of attaining desired positive self views.

Where the truth about oneself worsens or varies it gradually becomes less feasible to satisfy all motives simultaneously.

In an attempt to compare the self-evaluation motives (excluding self-improvement) a self-reflection task was employed. Participants were asked to choose the question they would most likely ask themselves in order to determine whether they possessed a certain personality trait. On the whole, people self-enhanced more than they self-assessed or self-verified. People chose higher diagnosticity questions concerning central, positive traits than central, negative ones, and answered yes more often to central, positive than negative questions. Also, people self-verified more than the self-assessed, and chose more questions overall concerning relatively certain central traits than relatively uncertain peripheral traits.

=== Other factors ===
- Cognitive load: Where people are in situations of great cognitive load, the tendency to self-enhance increases, almost as if instinctive. People are quicker to agree with possessing positive traits and slower to reject having negative traits.
- Modifiability: Where a trait or characteristic is seen as unchangeable people are more self-enhancing versus perceiving the trait to be modifiable.
- Diagnosticity: Where a trait or characteristic is seen as highly diagnostic people are less likely to self-enhance, for fear of being caught out in the process of an erroneous attempt at self-enhancement as neurosis.

== See also ==
- Identity (social science)
- Individualistic culture
- Basking in reflected glory
- Memory
- Self-control
- Self-categorization theory
- Self-determination theory
- Self-evaluation maintenance theory
- Self-knowledge (psychology)
