= Abraham Tesser =

American psychologist

- Born: Abraham Tesser; May 24, 1941 (age 85); Brooklyn, New York City, U.S.
- Education: Purdue University (PhD, 1967)
- Scientific career
- Fields: psychology, Social psychology
- Workplaces: University of Georgia

Abraham Tesser is an American social psychologist and Distinguished Research Professor Emeritus at the University of Georgia, known for his work on the self‑evaluation maintenance (SEM) model, the “Mum Effect,” self‑generated attitude change, and attitude heritability. His research has been influential in the study of self‑processes, interpersonal behavior, and social cognition, and he has served in leadership roles including president of the Society for Personality and Social Psychology and director of the University of Georgia’s Institute for Behavioral Research. Following his retirement from academia, Tesser became active as a studio furniture designer and maker, exhibiting work in juried shows and national craft publications.

== Biography ==
Abraham Tesser received a BA from Long Island University in 1962 and an MS in 1965 and PhD in 1967 from Purdue University. He is now a Distinguished Research Professor Emeritus from the University of Georgia where he held a faculty position (1967–1999) and directed the Institute for Behavioral Research (1984–1994). His research has been supported by the National Science Foundation and the National Institute for Mental Health. He served in the field of social psychology as president in 2000 of the Society for Personality and Social Psychology and as editor of the Journal of Personality and Social Psychology. In 2025, Tesser was recognized as a Distinguished Alumnus by Purdue University. His major research contributions have been in the areas of interpersonal communication, attitudes and the psychology of self.

== Research ==
=== Interpersonal Communication: The Mum Effect ===
This research, in collaboration with Sidney Rosen, identified (and named) a robust tendency for persons to avoid communicating information with negative consequences (bad news) to the relevant recipient. A variety of explanations for the effect has been explored and reported.

=== Attitudes ===
Self-generated attitude change (attitude polarization). This research suggests that simply thinking about an attitude object, even with no new information or change in circumstances, can result in attitude change in a more extreme direction (polarization). Such changes seem to depend on the presence of cognitive schemas.

Attitudes and Behavior: The Mismatch Model. Self-reported attitudes might primarily reflect a person's feelings or beliefs about an attitude object. Behavior with respect to the object might also primarily reflect feelings (consummatory behaviors) or beliefs (instrumental behaviors). According to the Mismatch Model, the relationship between attitudes and behavior is maximized when there is a match between the attitude component reflected in the self-report and the component reflected in the behavior.

Attitude Heritability. Attitudes differ in the extent to which they are influenced by genetic factors, i.e., their heritability. Attitudes with greater heritability are more accessible, more resistant to social influence, and more influential in attracting or repelling others.

=== The Psychology of Self ===
The Self-evaluation maintenance theory posits two processes—the comparison process and the reflection process—to explain how the outstanding performance of others can affect one’s own behavior. When a close other (e.g., a friend or relative) performs better in a highly self-relevant domain, self-evaluation is likely to suffer by comparison. If the performance domain is low in self-relevance, the reflection process is more important and the outstanding performance of a close other boosts self-evaluation. Predictions can be tested about when people will alter the self-relevance of a domain, adjust closeness to others, or facilitate or hinder others’ performance. The emotions underlying these behavioral changes have also been explored. The model has been extended to committed relationships, such as marriage, by Stephen Beach.

Confluence and the Self Zoo. The number of processes that affect self-esteem is large and diverse—a “self zoo.” Using three broad classes of mechanisms (cognitive consistency, social comparison, and value expression), this work shows that many mechanisms are not independent. For example, a threat to self-esteem via social comparison can be addressed via increases in cognitive consistency or value expression and vice versa. The element that connects these processes is posited to be negative affect.

== Later life and furniture design ==
After retiring from academia, Tesser became active as a studio furniture designer and maker, a pursuit he had practiced informally for several decades. His work emphasizes sculptural forms, curved geometries, and the expressive figure of wood.

Tesser’s furniture has been included in numerous juried exhibitions, including the 47th, 48th, and 49th Juried Exhibitions at the Lyndon House Arts Center in Athens, Georgia. He presented a solo exhibition, Maquettes, at the Lyndon House Arts Center in 2023–24. His work has also appeared in national juried shows such as the 20th Master Woodworkers Show in Knoxville, Tennessee, the Wharton Esherick Museum’s 27th Annual Juried Exhibition, and multiple Southworks National Juried Exhibitions.

Tesser has received several awards for his work, including the Juror’s Award for First Place 3D at the 2024 Southworks National Exhibition, the Ridley M. Glover Excellence in Wood Artistry Award at the 49th Juried Exhibition of the Lyndon House Arts Center (2024), the Best of Show Award at The Chair Show (2020), and the People's Choice Award at the 20th Master Woodworkers Show (2019).

His furniture and design process have been featured in national craft publications, including Fine Woodworking, American Woodturner, and museum publications such as Georgia in Our Time from the Georgia Museum of Art. He is affiliated with professional organizations including The Furniture Society and the American Guild of Judaic Art.
