= Mnemic neglect =

Selective forgetting

Mnemic neglect is a term used in social psychology to describe a pattern of selective forgetting in which certain autobiographical memories tend to be recalled more easily if they are consistent with positive self-concept. The mnemic neglect model stipulates that memory is self-protective if the information is negative, self-referent, and concerns central traits.

== Mnemic neglect model ==
Experiments have been conducted to test for the specific conditions under which mnemic neglect occurs. A standard procedure has been used across several experiments to test for these conditions. In this procedure, participants are presented with a list of 32 behavioral traits. They are asked to either encode each trait as if it applied to them (i.e. "consider people describing you with these traits") or as if it applied to a stranger named Chris (i.e. "consider people describing Chris with these traits"). Several of these experiments have found that the first condition under which mnemic neglect occurs is that the traits must be negative. Feedback from others is less easily recalled when it is negative in nature than when it is positive. Second, the information must be self-referent. Sedikides and Green (2004) conducted a study using the standard procedure in which half of the participants were asked to consider feedback as if it applied to them and half were asked to consider the same feedback as if it applied to someone else. They found that negative feedback was recalled as frequently as positive feedback when the feedback was directed at another. However, when the feedback was directed at oneself, negative feedback was recalled less frequently than positive feedback. Third, the information must pertain to a central, rather than peripheral, self-conception. A central self-conception is a generally positive trait that is considered fixed and highly descriptive (i.e. trustworthy vs. untrustworthy). In contrast, a peripheral self-conception is considered only moderately descriptive, less positive, and less important (i.e. modest vs. immodest). Feedback that counteracts a central self-conception is recalled much less frequently than feedback that counteracts a peripheral self-conception. In fact, the recall for feedback on modifiable traits was unaffected by whether the feedback was positive or negative.

== Hypothesized mechanism ==
Sedikides and Green (2004) offered a mechanism by which they believe mnemic neglect occurs. Self-referent information is processed in two stages. The first stage checks the information for compatibility with self-concept. Self-threatening information is confined to this stage because it is found to be incompatible with self-concept. During the second stage, self-flattering information is compared to similar episodic memories. The theory is that deeper processing occurs at the second stage, so information processed at this stage is recalled more easily.

Although research has demonstrated a difference in recall between threatening and non-threatening information, there is no difference in recognition of threatening and non-threatening information. In other words, self-threatening information is recalled less easily than non-threatening information but it is recognized equally well, meaning that subjects can identify whether they received the information or not regardless of its connotations. However, in a free recall task, subjects show a memory bias for non-threatening information. To account for this difference, Pinter, Green, Sedikides, and Gregg (2011) modified the suggested mechanism behind mnemic neglect. They hypothesized that people compare incoming information to past experience. If the information is consistent with self-knowledge, then the information is integrated with this knowledge. If the information is inconsistent with self-knowledge, then it is processed separately. Therefore, self-threatening information is less easily recalled but just as easily recognized as non-threatening information because separate processing leads to fewer retrieval routes.

This mechanism was tested by Pinter and his colleagues experimentally. Half of the participants were prompted to incorporate the information they were given into their self-concept. They were instructed to find similarities between the information and their self-knowledge and determine reasons for why the information described them. This process was termed integration. The other half of the participants were prompted to separate the information from their self-concept. They were asked to identify differences between the information and their self-knowledge and determine reasons for why the information did not describe them. This process was termed separation. The first finding of the experiment was that recall for both positive and negative information was poorer for separation than for integration. However, recognition was the same between the two groups. The second finding was that self-protection is more important than self-enhancement. A greater effect was seen for attempting to integrate central negative information than for attempting to separate central positive information.

This mechanism has been challenged by those who believe that mnemic neglect is a product of expectancies rather than self-protection motives. In other words, negative information is not processed as deeply as positive information because it is incompatible with self-concept as opposed to simply unflattering. People do not recall a behavior describing them that indicates untrustworthiness not because they want to protect themselves but because this behavior is inconsistent with how they would actually behave. This alternative explanation accounts for the absence of memory bias in recalling information about a stranger (Chris). People have no expectancies about this stranger Chris, so positive and negative information are processed equally well.

Newman, Nibert, and Winer (2009) emphasized ruling out the possibility that mnemic neglect occurs due to incompatibility with expectancies. It was suspected that mnemic neglect might be an issue of self-verification rather than self-protection or self-enhancement. Self-verification and self-protection are difficult concepts to separate because most people tend to think of themselves favorably. Green and Sedikides (2004) attempted to address this concern by conducting two experiments. In one experiment, the participants were pre-selected. Half viewed themselves positively on certain dimensions and half viewed themselves negatively. All participants had better recall for positive dimensions. In another experiment, a stranger Chris was described to participants before they read the behaviors. Chris was described as a superhuman, incredibly kind and trustworthy, in an attempt to establish expectancies about Chris. Other participants in the same study were asked to imagine the traits described a close friend whom the participants hold in high regard. In comparison to these two cases, recall for positive traits was still better when these traits were self-referent rather than directed at another.

Despite these findings, the mechanism was still challenged because the results were open to interpretation. Perhaps participants had more favorable expectancies for themselves than for others. Newman, Nibert, and Winer (2009) sought to test the expectancies possibility more directly. They hypothesized that participants who were more focused on testing information against their expectancies would have different recall biases than participants who were more likely to be focused on self-protection. Defensive pessimists were identified as people who are more likely to focus on expectancies. Defensive pessimists think extensively about possible future outcomes, both positive and negative. Their ultimate goal is to be prepared. They should still exhibit a preference for positive over negative information, but they are more likely to approach a situation with “Is this a reasonable thing to expect?” as opposed to “Will this make me feel bad about myself?” Thus, it was hypothesized that defensive pessimists would recall more favorable than unfavorable behaviors in both themselves and others when subjected to the standard test for mnemic neglect. The findings supported the hypothesis. Defensive pessimists showed a bias for the recall of positive information over negative information for both themselves and others, thereby offering further support to the hypothesized mechanism of mnemic neglect (i.e. mnemic neglect is based on self-protection rather than self-verification).

== Evidence against hypothesized mechanism ==
The recollection of autobiographical memories can trigger emotions. Research shows that the intensity of the emotion experienced at the time of the event decreases over time, such that the intensity of the emotion associated with the recollection of the event is less than the intensity of the emotion experienced during the event. The fading affect bias is a phenomenon in which emotions associated with a negative event fade faster than emotions associated with a positive event.

Like mnemic neglect, the fading affect bias is hypothesized to promote positive self-concept. Despite the similarities between mnemic neglect and fading affect bias, the hypothesized mechanisms of fading affect bias differ from that of mnemic neglect. One hypothesized mechanism of fading affect bias is that negative experiences are gradually reinterpreted as transformative events. In the process, these memories lose emotional intensity. For example, people often reinterpret hardships as opportunities to experience personal growth. A second hypothesized mechanism suggests that the conveying of autobiographical events to others minimizes negative aspects of the story and emphasizes positive aspects. In fact, a study by Skowronski, Gibbons, Vogl, and Walker (2004) demonstrated that fading affect bias is stronger for events frequently disclosed to others. Both of these mechanisms suggest that the superior retention of positive emotions over negative emotions is not a function of initial coding. Rather, poorer retention of negative emotions may be a function of recoding over time.

== Limits of the mnemic neglect model: selective nature of self-protection ==
One limitation of the mnemic neglect model is its inability to explain why people respond to negative information differently. Why is it that sometimes people react to negative feedback with defensive anger and other times with thoughtful reflection? Green, Sedikides, Pinter, and Van Tongeren (2009) conducted two experiments to determine the boundaries of mnemic neglect. They hypothesized that the self-protection aspect of mnemic neglect is flexible and that the mnemic neglect model is only upheld under certain conditions. More specifically, these researchers hypothesized that mnemic neglect does not occur when there is an opportunity for self-improvement and when feedback concerning an individual’s personality is provided in the context of a close relationship.

In their first experiment, these researchers tested the effect motivation to improve the self has on mnemic neglect. They hypothesized that mnemic neglect would not be observed in individuals motivated to enhance themselves because this motivation leads to deeper processing which in turn creates more retrieval routes. In this experiment, half of the participants were exposed to a task aimed to prime them for self-motivation. The other half was not exposed to this task. After the priming task, all of the participants were exposed to the standard test for mnemic neglect in which they were asked to read through a list of personality traits. Some were asked to imagine that the traits applied to them while others were asked to imagine that the traits applied to another named Chris. In the condition where self-improvement was primed, self-threatening and self-affirming information were recalled equally. Researchers believe that the findings of this experiment indicate the existence of a balance between the desire to protect oneself and the desire to improve oneself.

In their second experiment, participants signed up as pairs. Half of the participants were assigned to work with their partner while the other half were assigned to work with strangers. One of the partners completed a personality test. The other partner received the first partner’s answers to the personality test and rated each of the responses as either positive or negative. The first participant then had an opportunity to review each of their partner’s positive/negative ratings. After a brief distractor test, the first participant was asked to recall as many of their partner’s feedback ratings as possible. Researchers found that when the two partners had a close relationship, mnemic neglect was not demonstrated. When the two partners were strangers, mnemic neglect was maintained.

Green, Sedikides, Pinter, and Van Tongeren admit that further research must be conducted to determine the mechanism behind the effect relationships have on mnemic neglect. Feedback from close friends may be more useful because individuals feel more comfortable to use the feedback constructively if it is provided within a supportive relationship. An alternative explanation is that recalling feedback from a friend may be important for maintaining a healthy relationship. However, a third explanation is that individuals commit this feedback to memory so that they may better prepare counterarguments for the future.

This research opens the door for future research to investigate individual differences in order to create a list of moderator variables that affect mnemic neglect.

== Mnemic neglect and dysphoria ==
Mood can affect cognitive performance. Research has demonstrated that individuals with dysphoria recall negative information more easily than positive information Saunders (2011) conducted three experiments to determine the relationship between dysphoria and mnemic neglect. In the first experiment, it was hypothesized that dysphoric patients are prone to malfunctioning mnemic neglect. They suffer from the inability to forget negative information. Thus, they should have better recall for self-threatening information than nondysphoric individuals. Participants were subjects to the standard mnemic neglect test procedure. It was determined that people with dysphoria have greater recall for central negative information. It was further hypothesized that a defect in mnemic neglect leads to more negative memories.

Experiment 1 also indicated that dysphoria patients had better recall for central negative information than peripheral negative information. Thus, it was hypothesized a reverse mnemic neglect model in dysphoria patients. For the second experiment, the same traits were presented to two separate groups of dysphoria patients. The first group received information before receiving the list of traits that described the traits as all unmodifiable, meaning that if one exhibits the trait as a child, he or she will certainly exhibit the trait as an adult. The second group received information that described the traits as all modifiable, meaning that if one exhibits the trait as a child, he or she can change as an adult. It was concluded that dysphoria patients recall unmodifiable traits better than they do modifiable traits.

In Experiment 3, it was hypothesized that individuals with dysphoria would demonstrate better recall for highly diagnostic behaviors than low diagnostic behaviors. A highly diagnostic behavior is one that is very descriptive of a trait. For instance, “I can keep secrets” is highly diagnostic of the trait trustworthiness. A low diagnostic behavior for trustworthiness might be “I would take a pen from a bank after using it”. This experiment followed the same procedure as Experiment 1 except that half of the dysphoria patients were presented highly diagnostic behaviors and half were presented low diagnostic behaviors. As expected, the participants negative information was more easily recalled when the information was highly diagnostic as opposed to low diagnostic.

Saunders explains her findings by suggesting that self-referent, negative, central information receives elaboration form dysphoric patients. They process this information more deeply than nondysphoric patients. In addition, individuals with dysphoria may have inhibitory deficits, where they are unable to keep negative information from flooding their conscious minds. These difficulties in suppressing negative memories could explain why the negative mood is sustained.

Dysphoric patients rated central negative traits just as negative as nondysphoric patients did, but they rated these traits as more important. It has been argued that the differences in mnemic neglect between individuals with and without dysphoria can be explained by mood-dependent memory (link). Simply, individuals with dysphoria believe that negative information is more self-referent than positive information. However, Saunders argues that there are effects beyond mood-dependent memory because the same effect would be seen for peripheral negative information, which in fact saw no difference in recall between the two groups. She also emphasizes that she would not have observed differences for modifiability and diagnosticity either if this were the case.

== Mnemic neglect and anxiety ==
There is evidence that individuals with anxiety also experience reverse mnemic neglect. Many studies have found no difference in memory bias between anxious and non-anxious individuals, but these studies have been criticized for using traits low in self-reference. A meta-analysis conducted by Mitte (2008) found that anxious individuals have better recall than non-anxious individuals for negative information and that non-anxious individuals have better recall than anxious individuals for neutral and positive information.

Saunders (2013) hypothesized that highly anxious individuals have better recall for central, negative traits than non-anxious individuals. A series of three experiments was conducted. Experiment 1 used the standard mnemic neglect procedure to compare the recall for various traits between high-anxious participants and low-anxious participants. As hypothesized, high-anxious participants showed greater recall than did low-anxious participants for central, negative traits.

Experiment 2 tested for the recall of highly diagnostic traits. It was hypothesized that high-anxious participants would show mnemic neglect for modifiable traits because these traits are not perceived as very threatening. However, unmodifiable traits would be immune to mnemic neglect for these participants and thus they would be recalled more easily. In this experiment, traits were either presented following a description of the traits as being changeable over time or following a description of the traits as being unalterable throughout life. As hypothesized, anxious participants were able to recall more unmodifiable than modifiable central negative traits.

It was hypothesized that anxious participants have better recall for highly diagnostic central negative traits. Diagnosticity refers to how well a behavior indicates an underlying trait. In experiment 3, both anxious and non-anxious participants were asked to rate how diagnostic each behavior was of a trait (i.e. Based on this behavior, how likely is it that this person is trustworthy?). No difference in diagnostic ratings was found between the two groups. However, anxious participants had higher recall than non-anxious participants for highly diagnostic central negative traits when they directed at themselves.

Thus, reverse mnemic neglect is experienced for unmodifiable and highly diagnostic traits among high-anxious individuals.
