= Self-verification theory =

Social psychological theory

Self-verification is a social psychological theory that asserts people want to be known and understood by others according to their firmly held beliefs and feelings about themselves, that is self-views (including self-concepts and self-esteem). It is one of the motives that drive self-evaluation, along with self-enhancement and self-assessment.

Because chronic self-concepts and self-esteem play an important role in understanding the world, providing a sense of coherence, and guiding action, people become motivated to maintain them through self-verification. Such strivings provide stability to people’s lives, making their experiences more coherent, orderly, and comprehensible than they would be otherwise. Self-verification processes are also adaptive for groups, groups of diverse backgrounds, and the larger society, in that they make people predictable to one another thus serve to facilitate social interaction. To this end, people engage in a variety of activities that are designed to obtain self-verifying information.

Developed by William Swann (1981), the theory grew out of earlier writings which held that people form self-views so that they can understand and predict the responses of others and know how to act toward them.

== Difference between positive and negative self-views ==
There are individual differences in people's views of themselves. Among people with positive self-views, the desire for self-verification works together with another important motive, the desire for positive evaluations or "self enhancement". For example, those who view themselves as "insightful" will find that their motives for both self-verification and self-enhancement encourage them to seek evidence that other people recognize their insightfulness.

In contrast, people with negative self-views will find that the desire for self-verification and self-enhancement are competing. Consider people who see themselves as disorganized. Whereas their desire for self-enhancement will compel them to seek evidence that others perceive them as organized, their desire for self-verification will compel such individuals to seek evidence that others perceive them as disorganized. Self-verification strivings tend to prevail over self-enhancement strivings when people are certain of the self-concept and when they have extremely depressive self-views.

Self-verification strivings may have undesirable consequences for people with negative self-views (depressed people and those who suffer from low self-esteem). For example, self-verification strivings may cause people with negative self-views to gravitate toward partners who mistreat them, undermine their feelings of self-worth, or even abuse them. And if people with negative self-views seek therapy, returning home to a self-verifying partner may undo the progress that was made there. Finally, in the workplace, the feelings of worthlessness that plague people with low self-esteem may foster feelings of ambivalence about receiving fair treatment, feelings that may undercut their propensity to insist that they get what they deserve from their employers (see: workplace bullying).

These findings and related ones point to the importance of efforts to improve the self-views of those who suffer from low self-esteem and depression.

== Effects on behavior ==
In one series of studies, researchers asked participants with positive and negative self-views whether they would prefer to interact with evaluators who had favorable or unfavorable impressions of them. The results showed that those with positive self-views preferred favorable partners and those with negative self-views preferred unfavorable partners. The latter finding revealed that self-verification strivings may sometimes surpass positivity strivings.

Self-verification motives operate for different dimensions of the self-concept and in many different situations. Men and women are equally inclined to display this tendency, and it does not matter whether the self-views refer to characteristics that are relatively immutable (e.g., intelligence) or changeable (e.g., diligence), or whether the self-views happen to be highly specific (e.g., athletic) or global (e.g., low self-esteem, worthlessness). Furthermore, when people chose negative partners over positive ones, it is not merely in an effort to avoid interacting with positive evaluators (that is, out of a concern that they might disappoint such positive evaluators). Rather, people chose self-verifying, negative partners even when the alternative is participating in a different experiment. Finally, recent work has shown that people work to verify self-views associated with group memberships. For example, women seek evaluations that confirm their belief that they possess qualities associated with being a woman.

Self-verification theory suggests that people may begin to shape others' evaluations of them before they even begin interacting with them. They may, for example, display identity cues (see: impression management). The most effective identity cues enable people to signal who they are to potential interaction partners.

- Physical appearance, such as clothes, body posture, demeanor. For example, the low self-esteem person who evokes reactions that confirm her negative self-views by slumping her shoulders and keeping her eyes fixed on the ground.
- Other cues, such as the car someone buys, the house they live in, the way they decorate their living environment. For example, an SUV evokes reactions that confirm a person's positive self-view.

Self-verification strivings may also influence the social contexts that people enter into and remain in. People reject those who provide social feedback that does not confirm their self-views, such as married people with negative self-views who reject spouses who see them positively and vice versa. College roommates behave in a similar manner. People are more inclined to divorce partners who perceived them too favorably. In each of these instances, people gravitated toward relationships that provided them with evaluations that confirmed their self-views and fled from those that did not.

When people fail to gain self-verifying reactions through the display of identity cue or through choosing self-verifying social environments, they may still acquire such evaluations by systematically evoking confirming reactions. For example, depressed people behave in negative ways toward their roommates, thus causing these roommates to reject them.

Self-verification theory predicts that when people interact with others, there is a general tendency for them to bring others to see them as they see themselves. This tendency is especially pronounced when they start out believing that the other person has misconstrued them, apparently because people compensate by working especially hard to bring others to confirm their self-views. People will even stop working on tasks to which they have been assigned if they sense that their performance is eliciting non-verifying feedback.

== Role of confirmation bias ==
Self-verification theory predicts that people’s self-views will cause them to see the world as more supportive of these self-views than it really is. That is, individuals process information in a biased manner. These biases may be conscious and deliberate, but are probably more commonly done effortlessly and non-consciously. Through the creative use of these processes, people may dramatically increase their chances of attaining self-verification. There are at least three relevant aspects of information processing in self-verification:

1. Attention: People will attend to evaluations that are self-confirming while ignoring non-confirming evaluations.
2. Memory retrieval: self-views bias memory recall to favor self-confirming material over non-confirming elements.
3. Interpretation of information: people tend to interpret information in ways that reinforce their self-views.

These distinct forms of self-verification may often be implemented sequentially. For example, in one scenario, people may first strive to locate partners who verify one or more self-views. If this fails, they may redouble their efforts to elicit verification for the self-view in question or strive to elicit verification for a different self-view. Failing this, they may strive to "see" more self-verification than actually exists. And, if this strategy is also ineffective, they may withdraw from the relationship, either psychologically or in actuality.

== Related processes ==
=== Preference for novelty ===
People seem to prefer modest levels of novelty; they want to experience phenomena that are unfamiliar enough to be interesting, but not so unfamiliar as to be frightening or too familiar as to be boring.

The implications of people's preference for novelty for human relationships are not straightforward and obvious. Evidence that people desire novelty comes primarily from studies of people's reactions to art objects and the like. This is different when it concerns human beings and social relationships because people can shift attention away from already familiar novel objects, while doing so in human relationships is difficult or not possible. But novel art objects are very different from people. If a piece of art becomes overly stimulating, we can simply shift our attention elsewhere. This is not a viable option should our spouse suddenly begin treating us as if we were someone else, for such treatment would pose serious questions about the integrity of people's belief systems. Consequently, people probably balance competing desires for predictability and novelty by indulging the desire for novelty within contexts in which surprises are not threatening (e.g., leisure activities), while seeking coherence and predictability in contexts in which surprises could be costly—such as in the context of enduring relationships.

=== Tension with self-enhancement ===
People's self-verification strivings are apt to be most influential when the relevant identities and behaviors matter to them. Thus, for example, the self-view should be firmly held, the relationship should be enduring, and the behavior itself should be consequential. When these conditions are not met, people will be relatively unconcerned with preserving their self-views and they will instead indulge their desire for self-enhancement. In addition, self-reported emotional reactions favor self-enhancement while more thoughtful processes favor self-verification.

But if people with firmly held negative self-views seek self-verification, this does not mean that they are masochistic or have no desire to be loved. In fact, even people with very low self-esteem want to be loved. What sets people with negative self-views apart is their ambivalence about the evaluations they receive. Just as positive evaluations foster joy and warmth initially, these feelings are later chilled by incredulity. And although negative evaluations may foster sadness that the "truth" could not be kinder, it will at least reassure them that they know themselves. Happily, people with negative self-views are the exception rather than the rule. That is, on the balance, most people tend to view themselves positively. Although this imbalance is adaptive for society at large, it poses a challenge to researchers interested in studying self-verification. That is, for theorists interested in determining if behavior is driven by self-verification or positivity strivings, participants with positive self-views will reveal nothing because both motives compel them to seek positive evaluations. If researchers want to learn if people prefer verification or positivity in a giving setting, they must study people with negative self-views.

=== Self-concept change ===
Although self-verification strivings tend to stabilize people's self-views, changes in self-views may still occur. Probably the most common source of change is set in motion when the social environment recognizes a significant change in a person's age (e.g., when adolescents become adults), status (e.g., when students become teachers), or social role (e.g., when someone is convicted of a crime). Suddenly, the community may change the way that it treats the person. Eventually the target of such treatment will bring his or her self-view into accord with the new treatment.

Alternatively, people may themselves conclude that a given self-view is dysfunctional or obsolete and take steps to change it. Consider, for example, a woman who decides that her negative self-views have led her to tolerate abusive relationship partners. When she realizes that such partners are making her miserable, she may seek therapy. In the hands of a skilled therapist, she may develop more favorable self-views which, in turn, steer her toward more positive relationship partners with whom she may cultivate healthier relationships. Alternatively, when a woman who is uncertain about her negative self-concept enters a relationship with a partner who is certain that she deserves to view herself more positively, that woman will tend to improve the self-concept.

== Criticism ==
Critics have argued that self-verification processes are relatively rare, manifesting themselves only among people with terribly negative self views. In support of this viewpoint, critics cite hundreds of studies indicating that people prefer, seek and value positive evaluations more than negative ones. Such skeptical assessments overlook three important points. First, because most people have relatively positive self-views, evidence of a preference for positive evaluations in unselected samples may in reality reflect a preference for evaluations that are self-verifying, because for such individuals self-verification and positivity strivings are indistinguishable. No number of studies of participants with positive self-views can determine whether self-verification or self-enhancement strivings are more common. Second, self-verification strivings are not limited to people with globally negative self-views; even people with high self-esteem seek negative evaluations about their flaws. Finally, even people with positive self-views appear to be uncomfortable with overly positive evaluations. For example, people with moderately positive self-views withdraw from spouses who evaluate them in an exceptionally positive manner.

Other critics have suggested that when people with negative self-views seek unfavorable evaluations, they do so as a means of avoiding truly negative evaluations or for purposes of self-improvement, with the idea being that this will enable them to obtain positive evaluations down the road. Tests of this idea have failed to support it. For example, just as people with negative self-views choose self-verifying, negative evaluators even when the alternative is being in another experiment, they choose to be in another experiment rather than interact with someone who evaluates them positively. Also, people with negative self-views are most intimate with spouses who evaluate them negatively, despite the fact that these spouses are relatively unlikely to enable them to improve themselves. Finally, in a study of people's thought processes as they chose interaction partners, people with negative self-views indicated that they chose negative evaluators because such partners seemed likely to confirm their self-views (an epistemic consideration) and interact smoothly with them (a pragmatic consideration); self-improvement was rarely mentioned.

== See also ==
- Identity negotiation
- Self
