= Self-evaluation maintenance theory =

Concept in social psychology

Self-evaluation maintenance (SEM) concerns discrepancies between two people in a relationship. The theory posits an individual will maintain as well as enhance their self-esteem via a social comparison to another individual. Self-evaluation refers to the self-perceived social ranking one has towards oneself. It is the continuous process of determining personal growth and progress, which can be raised or lowered by the behavior of others. Abraham Tesser created the self-evaluation maintenance theory in 1988. The self-evaluation maintenance model assumes two things: that a person will try to maintain or increase their own self-evaluation, and self-evaluation is influenced by relationships with others.

A person's self-evaluation (which is similar to self-esteem) may be raised when a close other performs well. For example, a sibling scores the winning goal in an important game. Self-evaluation will increase because that person is sharing his/her success. The closer the psychological relationship and the greater the success, the more a person will share in the success. This is considered the reflection process. When closeness and performance are high, self-evaluation is raised in the reflection process. If someone who is psychologically close performs well on a task that is irrelevant to a person's self-definition, that person is able to benefit by sharing in the success of the achievement.

At the same time, the success of a close other can decrease someone's self-evaluation in the comparison process. This is because the success of a close other invites comparison on one's own capabilities, thereby directly affecting one's own self-evaluation. This is also strengthened with the closeness of the psychological relationship with the successful other. Using a similar example: a sibling scores the winning goal in an important game; but you are also on the same team and through comparison, your self-evaluation is lowered. When closeness (sibling) and performance (scored the winning goal) are high, self-evaluation is decreased in the comparison process. This is further expressed when the comparison is related to something you value in your personal identity. If you are aspiring to become a professional soccer player, but your sibling scores the winning goal and you do not, the comparison aspect of SEM will decrease your self-evaluation.

In both the reflection and comparison processes, closeness and performance level are significant factors. If the closeness of another decreases, then a person is less likely to share the success and/or compare him/herself, which lessens the likelihood of decreasing self-evaluation. A person is more likely to compare him/herself to someone close to him/her, like a sibling or a best friend, than a stranger. There are different factors in which a person can assume closeness: family, friends, people with similar characteristics, etc. If an individual is not close to a particular person, then it makes sense that he/she will not share in their success or be threatened by their success. At the same time, if the person's performance is low, there is no reason to share the success and increase self-evaluation; there is also no reason to compare him/herself to the other person. Because their performance is low, there is no reason it should raise or lower his/her self-evaluation. According to Tesser's (1988) theory, if a sibling did not do well in his/her game, then there is no reason the individual's self-evaluation will be affected.

Closeness and performance can either raise self-evaluation through reflection or lower self-evaluation through comparison. Relevance to self-identity determines whether reflection or comparison will occur. There are many different dimensions that can be important to an individual's self-definition. A self-defining factor is any factor that is personally relevant to your identity. For example, skills in music may be important to one's self-definition, but at the same time, being good in math may not be as important, even if you are skilled at it. Relating to your self-definition, you may consider yourself a musician but not a mathematician, even if you are skilled in both. Relevance assumes that a particular factor that is important to an individual is also important to another person. Relevance can be as simple as a shared dimension which one considers important to who they are. If relevance is high, then one will engage in comparison, but if relevance is low, one will engage in reflection. For example, if athletics is important to a person and that person considers athletics to be an important dimension of his/her self-definition, then when a sibling does well in athletics, the comparison process will take place and his/her self-evaluation will decrease. On the other hand, if athletics is not a dimension he/she uses for self-definition, the reflection process will take place and he/she will celebrate the sibling's success with the sibling; his/her self-evaluation will increase along with the sibling's because he/she is not threatened or challenged by the sibling's athletic capability.

Tesser (1988) suggests that people may do things to reduce the decrease in self-evaluation from comparison. One can spend less time with that particular individual, thereby reducing closeness or one can change their important self-definition and take up a new hobby or focus on a different self-defining activity, which reduces relevance (e.g., A siblings success in your favorite sport may lead you to stop playing). The third way of avoiding a decrease in self-evaluation through the comparison process is to affect another's performance (e.g., by hiding a sibling's favorite shoes or believe that his/her performance was based on luck) or one can improve their own skills by practicing more. The conditions that predict whether an individual will interfere with another's performance in the sake of their own self-evaluation include the closeness of the individuals and the relevance of the activity. When the relevance is high, the comparison process is more important than the reflection process. When the relevance is high and the activity is high in self-defining importance, the other person poses a larger threat than when the relevance is low.

== Moral behavior ==
Mazar et al. (2008) investigated how self-concept maintenance applies to moral behavior. They found that participants engaged in dishonest behaviors to achieve external benefits up to a point. However, their need to maintain a positive view of themselves, as being honest, limited the extent of their dishonest behavior.

== Research examples ==
Tesser & Smith (1980) experimented with this theory. Men were recruited and asked to bring a friend with them. They were then put into groups of four, Man A and Man A's friend along with Man B and Man B's friend. Half the subjects were told that the study's purpose was measuring important verbal skills and leadership. This was the high relevance group. The other two subjects were told that the task had nothing to do with verbal skills, leadership or anything important. This was considered the low relevance group. The activity was based on the game Password, where persons have to guess a word based on clues. Each man was given an opportunity to guess the word while the other three gave clues from a list. The other three can give clues that are easy or difficult based on their own judgment and whether or not they would like to help the other person guess the word. The clues given to the person were necessary to guess the word. The first pair of partners performed poorly (as instructed in the experimental design). The experiment was interested in the behavior of the second group of men. The next pairing was designed to partner a stranger with a friend. Researchers were trying to see when a friend was helped more than a stranger and when a stranger was helped more than a friend. The results supported their hypothesis. In 10 out of 13 sessions, when relevance was high (told that this activity measures important verbal and leadership skills) the stranger was helped more than a friend. Also, in 10 out of 13 sessions, when relevance was low (subjects were told that this activity determined nothing of importance) the friend was helped more than the stranger. The prediction of the self-evaluation maintenance theory was strongly supported.

Having previously discovered that the most positive evaluations occurred in participants who have low relevance with high closeness to another individual, Tesser (1989) sought to test whether emotional arousal mediated this relation. In the above sibling sport examples, it is evident that the self-evaluation process is an emotionally stimulating one. Tesser was interested in whether the emotional effect was a side-effect of the self-evaluation process, or whether it was a mediating effect (i.e., whether it was a partial factor influencing the evaluation). Tesser believed that if emotion was a mediating factor, that if emotional arousal was engaged and misattributed, that the self-evaluation process would be activated with all other factors controlled. To test, subjects arrived in pairs that knew one another prior. Two conditions were given vitamin C pills, where in the control condition they were truthfully told the pills would have no effect, and in the misattribution condition, they were told these pills would cause arousal, activating a placebo effect. Subjects then completed both relevant and non-relevant tasks, both with other subjects close and not close with them, then ratings of the other participants were measured. The results found that subjects in the misattribution condition had much more extreme ratings of other participants. When the task was high in relevancy, the subject rating the other participant much worse than the control condition. The findings show that while emotional activation is not the only factor determining evaluations, it is a mediating factor with some effect.

Zuckerman & Jost (2001) discuss how the self-evaluation maintenance (SEM) theory relates to the so-called “friendship paradox.” According to SEM, individuals are motivated to maintain or enhance their self-evaluation when comparing themselves to close others; whether another person’s success increases or threatens one’s own self-evaluation depends on how relevant the domain is to the individual and how close the relationship is. In some experimental conditions, for example, people may evaluate a stranger more favorably than a friend to reduce threats to their self-evaluation when the friend’s success is highly self-relevant. Feld’s (1991) research on the friendship paradox, by contrast, shows that — purely as a mathematical network effect — most people’s friends have, on average, more friends than they do because people with many connections are overrepresented in social circles. This structural observation does not reflect individuals’ motivational strategies but illustrates how network structure can skew subjective perceptions of popularity. These are not the only research examples; for further studies see the references.

This graph illustrates the basic principles of Tesser's (1988) self-evaluatory maintenance model of behavior. Relevance determines whether reflection or comparison will occur. When relevance is low (the factor does not affect self-definition) as the other's performance increases, so does self-evaluation, allowing that person to share in the celebration of the other person (reflection). When relevance is high (the factor is important to self-definition also) as the other's performance increases, self-evaluation decreases because that person is being compared to the other person (comparison). If relevance is high, then one will engage in comparison, but if relevance is low, one will engage in reflection.

== See also ==
- Evaluation
- Friendship paradox
- Implicit egotism
- Self
