= Self-evaluation motives =

Drives for development, maintenance, or modification of self-views

Self-evaluation is the process by which the self-concept is socially negotiated and modified. It is a scientific and cultural truism that self-evaluation is motivated. Empirically-oriented psychologists have identified and investigated three cardinal self-evaluation motives (or self-motives) relevant to the development, maintenance, and modification of self-views.

== Self Evolution Motives ==
Self-evolution, or personal growth, is often motivated by various factors including:

Desire for improvement
Many individuals seek to evolve and grow because they want to become better versions of themselves, whether it's in their careers, relationships, or personal development.
Goal achievement
People often engage in self-evolution to achieve specific goals they have set for themselves, such as advancing in their careers, improving their health, or learning new skills.
Overcoming challenges
Facing challenges or setbacks can motivate individuals to evolve and grow in order to overcome obstacles and become more resilient.
Seeking fulfillment
Some individuals pursue self-evolution in search of greater fulfillment and meaning in their lives, aiming to align their actions and values with a deeper sense of purpose.
Adaptation to change
In a rapidly changing world, the ability to adapt and evolve is essential. People may engage in self-evolution to stay relevant, competitive, or to navigate transitions in their lives.
Inspiration from others
Role models, mentors, or inspirational figures can motivate individuals to embark on their own journeys of self-evolution by demonstrating what is possible and providing guidance and support.
Personal satisfaction
The process of self-evolution itself can be rewarding, leading to increased self-awareness, confidence, and a sense of accomplishment.
Happiness and well-being
Pursuing self-evolution can contribute to greater overall happiness and well-being by helping individuals develop healthier habits, cultivate positive relationships, and manage stress more effectively.
Identity development
Self-evolution also plays a critical role in the formation and refinement of personal identity, particularly during transitional life stages such adolescence and early adulthood.
Technological influence
Modern technology, especially social media offers both inspiration and pressure for self-evolution through constant exposure to curated representations of success and self-actualization.

Ultimately, the motives for self-evolution can vary widely from person to person, and are influenced by a combination of internal and external factors.

== Types ==
=== Self-Enhancement ===
The self-enhancement motive is the motive to improve the positivity of one's self-concept, and to protect the self from negative information (we search for positivity and avoid negativity). This motive influences people's self-evaluations by promoting selective information processing.

For instance, people process information important to the self in a selective manner, focusing on information that has favourable implications to the self and discarding information with unfavourable implications. People also choose to compare themselves socially to others so as to be placed in a favourable position. By doing this, people seek to boost the (self-evaluated) positivity of themselves or to decrease its negativity, hence increasing their levels of self-esteem with the aim of having others see them as more socially desirable.

The self-enhancement motive is related to social comparison theory as it often leads individuals to engage in social comparisons that favour their self-image. Upward Comparisons (to someone superior) can motivate improvement, while downward comparisons (to someone inferior) can enhance self esteem.

Research shows that self-enhancement can lead to increased psychological resilience, though excessive self-enhancement may result in narcissistic traits or distorted self-views. individuals high in this motive often favour tasks with a high likelihood of success and process positive feedback more deeply while dismissing or discounting negative evaluations, particularly when the feedback pertains to traits perceived as fixed or unchangeable. This can contribute to a feedback loop where distorted self-views are perpetuated, potentially hindering personal growth and honest self-appraisal.

=== Self-Assessment ===
The self-assessment motive is based on the assumption that people want to have an accurate and objective evaluation of the self. To achieve this goal, they work so as to reduce any uncertainty about their abilities or personality traits. Feedback is sought to increase the accuracy and objectivity of previously formed self-conceptions. This is regardless of whether the new information confirms or challenges the previously existing self-conceptions.

This motive is especially pronounced in individuals who value personal growth and self-knowledge and it plays a key role in academic and professional development settings.

=== Self-Verification ===
The self-verification motive asserts that what motivates people to engage in the self-evaluation process is the desire to verify their pre-existing self-conceptions, maintaining consistency between their previously formed self-conceptions and any new information that could be important to the self (feedback). By doing this, people get the sense of control and predictability in the social world.

For example, individuals with a negative self-view may prefer others who confirm their negative self-image rather than challenge it, as confirmation (even of negative traits) reinforces stability in identity.

== Conditions ==
=== Self-Enhancement ===
The Self-enhancement motive states that people want to see themselves favourably. It follows that people should choose tasks with a positive valence, regardless of task diagnosticity (this motive is more active in presence of tasks high in diagnosticity of success than in presence of tasks high in diagnosticity of failure). Negative feedback is often dismissed or deemed less relevant, while positive feedback is processed more deeply and remembered more accurately.

Each motive elicits a different type of reaction (cognitive, affective or behavioural). The self-enhancement motive creates both affective and cognitive responses. Affective responses result in negative feedback leading to reduced positive emotions, especially when it concerns traits that are seen as unchangeable. This is moderated by trait modifiability, in the sense that we can find the former event to be especially true for unmodifiable traits. On the other hand, cognitive responses lead to favourable feedback being judged as more accurate than negative feedback, particularly for modifiable traits.

=== Self-Assessment ===
The self-assessment motive postulates that people want to have an accurate understanding of their abilities and personality traits. Hence, when evaluating the self people tend to preferably choose tasks that are high in diagnosticity (people want to find out about their uncertain self-conceptions). This is found even when the diagnosis leads to a disclosure of failure (i.e., regardless of task valence).

The motive generates behavioural responses, evidenced by the tendency to choose tasks that offer feedback on their performance (they prefer tasks for which feedback is available, opposed to tasks with unavailable feedback). This pattern is emphasized when the trait or ability is considered to be modifiable. This motive underlies practices such as self-testing, introspection and soliciting constructive criticism.

=== Self-Verification ===
The self-verification motive asserts that individuals seek confirmation of certain self-conceptions more than uncertain ones. There is no clear preference regarding the task valence (positive or negative outcomes).

Cognitive responses guide the self-verification motive partially depending on their previously formed self-concept. That is, when a certain trait is present, positive feedback regarding this trait is judged to be more accurate than unfavourable feedback; but when in the presence of the alternative trait, there isn’t any difference in the judgement of the feedback accuracy. However, this pattern is conditional on perceived trait modifiability.

The self-verification motive resulted in cognitive responses to traits considered to be unmodifiable, but not to traits considered modifiable. In the former, positive feedback is considered more accurate than negative feedback, when in the presence of the trait. On the other hand, negative feedback is viewed as more accurate than positive feedback in the presence of the alternative trait. This motive is particularly active for self-views considered stable or core to one’s identity.
