= Outline of self =

Overview of and topical guide to self

The following outline is provided as an overview of and topical guide to the human self:

Self – individuality, from one's own perspective. To each person, self is that person. Oneself can be a subject of philosophy, psychology and developmental psychology; religion and spirituality, social science and neuroscience.

== In general ==
- Human
- Human condition
- Individuality (selfhood) – state or quality of being an individual; particularly of being a person separate from other persons and possessing his or her own needs or goals, rights and responsibilities. The exact definition of an individual is important in the fields of biology, law, and philosophy.
- Person – being that has certain capacities or attributes such as reason, morality, consciousness or self-consciousness, and being a part of a culturally established form of social relations such as kinship, ownership of property, or legal responsibility.
- Personhood – status of being a person. Defining personhood is a controversial topic in philosophy and law and is closely tied with legal and political concepts of citizenship, equality, and liberty. According to law, only a natural person or legal personality has rights, protections, privileges, responsibilities, and legal liability.
- Philosophy of self
- Psychology of self
- Religious views on the self

== Components of self ==
- Body
- Brain / Mind / Intelligence
- Character
- Experience
- Sentience
- Gender
- Personal identity (see below)
- Personality (see below)
- Self-concept
- Self-awareness
- Self-consciousness
- Self-control
- Self-esteem
- Self-guilt
- Self-knowledge
- Self-perception
- Self-realization
- Self-fulfillment
- Self-worth
- Skill
- Wisdom

=== Personal identity ===
Personal identity

- Future self
- Identity (philosophy)
- Identity (social science)
  - Identity formation
  - Cultural identity
  - Moral identity
  - Social identity
- Open individualism
- Personally identifiable information
- Self-identity
- Self-image
- Self-schema
- Teletransportation paradox
- Vertiginous question

=== Personality ===
Personality

==== Personality traits ====
Personality trait

===== Big Five personality traits =====
Big Five personality traits

- Extraversion and introversion
- Agreeableness
- Conscientiousness
- Neuroticism / Emotional stability
- Openness to experience

===== Virtues =====
Virtue – characteristic of a person which supports individual moral excellence and collective well-being. Such characteristics are valued as a principle and recognized as a good way to be. This list is necessarily incomplete.

- Virtues of self-control
  - Ambition – self-control regarding one's goals
  - Ataraxia – Concept in Hellenistic philosophy
  - Brahmacharya – Motivated abstinence from worldly pleasures
  - Calmness – Mental state of inner peace
  - Chastity – Ethic concept of temperance related to sexuality
  - Contentment – Emotional state
  - Continence – self-control regarding unwise inclinations
  - Diligence – Carefulness and persistent effort or work
  - Discipline – Self-control
  - Endurance – Ability of an organism to exert itself and remain active for a long period of time
  - Equanimity – State of psychological stability and composure
  - Forbearance or Patience – Ability to endure difficult circumstances
  - Good temper – Term used to indicate the mixture of the innate aspects of the personality
  - Kshama – Sanskrit term meaning patience or forgiveness
  - Kshanti – Buddhist concept of patience, forbearance and forgiveness
  - Moderation – Process of eliminating or lessening extremes
  - Prudence – Ability of a person to regulate itself with the use of reason
  - Renunciation – Act of rejecting something previously endorsed
  - Restraint – Aspect of inhibitory control
  - Sobriety – Condition of being unaffected by alcohol
  - Temperance – Cardinal virtue of control over excess
  - Thrift or Frugality – Being frugal in the consumption of consumable resources
- Virtues of self-efficacy
  - Adhiṭṭhāna – Resolute determination, in Buddhism
  - Aptitude – Ability; competence to do a certain kind of work at a certain level
  - Assertiveness – Capacity of being self-assured without being aggressive to defend a point of view
  - Boldness – Vigour and valour in action
  - Confidence – Feeling of trust in someone or something
  - Conscientiousness – Personality trait of being orderly and following the rules
  - Courage – Ability to deal with fear
  - Craft – Skill performed manually
  - Creativity – Forming something new and somehow valuable
  - Determination – Positive emotional feeling
  - Dhrti – Yama (ethical rule) in Hinduism
  - Drive – Person's desire for significant accomplishment
  - Enthusiasm – Intense enjoyment, interest or approval towards something
  - Ganbaru – Japanese phrase for perseverance
  - Grit – Psychological concept
  - Hardiness – Ability to endure stress without negative health effects
  - Health – Desirable level of functional or metabolic efficiency of a living being
  - Liberty – State of freedom from constraint
  - Perseverance – ability to work steadily despite setbacks or difficulties
  - Persistence – Personality trait in psychology
  - Physical fitness – State of health and well-being
  - Preparedness – Precautionary measures in the face of potential disasters
  - Prosperity – Concept of economies regarding wealth, health, happiness, community and spirit
  - Resilience – Ability to mentally cope with a crisis
  - Self-cultivation – Development of one's virtues
  - Self-directedness – Adaptability of one's own behavior to achieve personally chosen goals and values
  - Self-help – Self-guided improvement
  - Sisu – Finnish concept
  - Tenacity
  - Vīrya – Buddhist term
  - Vitality – Capacity to live, grow, or develop
  - Workmanship – Skill at performing a task
- Virtues of regard and respect
  - Accountability – Concept of responsibility in ethics, governance and decision-making
  - Asteya – Non-stealing, a virtue in Indian religions
  - Authenticity – Concept in existential psychology and philosophy
  - Empathy – Ability to understand or feel what another is feeling
  - Fair-mindedness – Principle of justice holding that decisions should be based on objective criteria
  - Faithfulness, Fidelity, Fides
  - Filial piety – Virtue and practice in Chinese classics and society at large
  - Gratitude – Feeling or attitude in acknowledgement of a benefit that one has received or will receive
  - Hospitality – Relationship between the guest and the host, or the art or practice of being hospitable
  - Hrī – Buddhist term
  - Humanitas – Latin noun
  - Humanity – Virtue linked with basic ethics
  - Humility – Quality of being humble
  - Listening – Hearing what others are saying, and trying to understand what it means
  - Loyalty – Faithfulness or devotion to a person, country, group, or cause
  - Obedience – Yielding to instructions from an authority figure
  - Politeness – Practical application of good manners or etiquette so as not to offend others
  - Pride – Positive effect from the perceived value of a person
  - Reciprocity – Repayment in kind
  - Respect – Feeling of regard for someone or something
  - Reverence – Attitude of deep respect tinged with awe
  - Self respect – Human emotional need
  - Solidarity – Unity of feeling or action on a common interest
  - Tolerance – Allowing or permitting something that one disapproveslow others to lead a life based on a certain set of beliefs differing from one's own
  - Truthfulness/Honesty – Moral quality of truthfulness
  - Social virtues:
    - Affection – Feeling or type of love
    - Agreeableness – Personality trait
    - Ārjava – Hindu philosophical concept
    - Charisma – Charm that can inspire devotion in others
    - Civility – Polite act or expression
    - Cleanliness – Abstract state of being clean and free from dirt
    - Compromise – Negotiation strategy
    - Conviviality – Basic form of human interaction
    - Cooperativeness – Personality trait
    - Courtesy – Gentle politeness and courtly manners
    - Etiquette – Customary code of polite behaviour
    - Eutrapelia – Ability of a person to have pleasant conversation
    - Interpersonal attraction – Study of the attraction between people that leads to friendship or romance
    - Intimacy – Physical or emotional intimacy
    - Leadership – Quality of an individual or group influencing or guiding others
    - Playfulness – Voluntary, intrinsically motivated recreation
    - Rapport – Close and harmonious relationship
    - Sense of community – Psychological concept
    - Sharing – Joint use of a resource or space
    - Social engagement – Degree of participation in a community or society
    - Social intelligence – Capacity to know oneself and to know others
    - Social responsibility – Ethical framework
    - Social skills – Competence facilitating interaction and communication with others
    - Sportsmanship – Ethos of fairness and enjoyment in sports
    - Sympathy – Feeling of pity for the distress of another
    - Tact
    - Teamwork – Collaborative effort of a team to achieve a common goal
    - Thoughtfulness
    - Trustworthiness – Assumption of and reliance on the honesty of another party
    - Unpretentiousness
- Virtues of kindness
  - Agape – Ancient Greek word for love
  - Ahimsa – Ancient Indian principle of nonviolence
  - Altruism – Concern for the well-being of others
  - Charity – Voluntary giving of help to those in need
    - Caritas – One of the seven theological virtues
    - Christian Charity – One of the seven theological virtues
    - Dāna – Concept of charity in Indian religions
  - Clemency – Forgiveness of a crime by the government
  - Compassion – Movement or motivation to help others
  - Daya
  - Forgiveness – Renunciation or cessation of resentment, indignation, or anger
  - Generosity – Liberality in giving
  - Gentleness – Personal quality
  - Helpfulness – Voluntarily prosocial behaviour
  - Karuṇā – Sanskrit term translated as empathy, compassion or mercy
  - Kindness – Type of behaviour
  - Love – Strong, positive emotional/mental states
  - Philanthropy – Private efforts to increase public good
  - Service – Selfless service and volunteering in Indian religions
  - Sevā – Selfless service and volunteering in Indian religions
- Specific
  - Cardinal virtues – Virtues of mind and character
  - Nine Noble Virtues – Moral and situational ethical guidelines in certain groupings of Odinism and Ásatrú
  - Prussian virtues – Ethical code associated with Prussian society
  - Seven virtues – Seven virtues in Christian tradition
  - Southern chivalry – 19th-century cultural concept of the Southern U.S.
  - Spanish chivalry – Knights in Medieval Spain
  - Theological virtues – Christian ethics
- Intellectual virtues
  - Attention – Psychological focus, perception and prioritising discrete information
  - Awareness – State of knowing or noticing something
  - Critical thinking – Analysis of facts to form a judgment
  - Curiosity – Quality related to inquisitive thinking
  - Deliberation – Process of thoughtfully weighing options, usually prior to voting
  - Emotional intelligence – Capability to understand one's emotions
  - Episteme – Philosophical term referring to systems of understanding (i.e. knowledge)
  - Epistemic virtues – Concept in philosophy
  - Flexibility – Extent to which a person can cope with changes
  - Foresight – Behavior-based backcasting & forecasting factors
  - Imagination – Creative ability
  - Insight – Understanding of a specific cause and effect in a specific context
  - Intellectual courage
  - Intellectual humility – Recognition of the limit of one's knowledge
  - Intelligence – Human capacity or ability to acquire, apprehend and apply knowledge
  - Intuition – Ability to acquire knowledge without conscious reasoning
  - Inventiveness – Concept in patent law
  - Judgement – Evaluation of circumstances to make a decision
  - Justice – Cardinal virtue
  - Knowledge – Awareness of facts, or competency
  - Logic
  - Open-mindedness – Receptiveness to new ideas
  - Openness – Personality trait
  - Originality – Aspect of created or invented works being new or novel
  - Perspicacity – Great discernment or insight
  - Philomathy – Lover of learning
  - Philosophy – Study of general and fundamental questions
  - Phronesis – Ancient Greek word for a type of wisdom or intelligence
  - Prajñā – Buddhist term often translated as "wisdom" or "intelligence"
  - Problem solving – Process of achieving a goal by overcoming obstacles
  - Rationality – Quality of being agreeable to reason
  - Reason – Capacity for consciously making sense of things
  - Rhetoric – Art of persuasion
  - Seny – Form of wisdom in Catalan culture
  - Scholarship – Body of principles and practices used by scholars and academics to make their claims
  - Skepticism – Doubtful attitude toward knowledge claims
  - Sophia – Personification of wisdom in philosophy and religion
  - Understanding – Ability to think about and use concepts to deal adequately with a subject
  - Wisdom – Combination of wit and virtue
  - Wit – Form of humour
- Other
  - List of emotions
  - Acceptance – Person's assent to the reality of a situation
  - Akrodha – Important virtue in Indian philosophy and Hindu ethics
  - Amor fati – Latin phrase meaning 'love of fate'
  - Aparigraha – Philosophy that holds that no one or anything possesses anything
  - Auctoritas – Roman prestige; contrast with power, imperium
  - Autonomy – Capacity for control, discretion or political self-governance
  - Awe – Emotion comparable to wonder
  - Balance
  - Benevolence
  - Candor
  - Cautiousness
  - Chivalry – Traditional ideology and code of conduct of knights
  - Citizenship
  - Civil courage
  - Commitment – Commitment to do or not do something
  - Consideration
  - Decorum – Principle of classical rhetoric, poetry, and theatrical theory
  - Dependability – Measure in systems engineering
  - Detachment – Philosophy of avoiding unnecessary pain
  - Dignitas – Ancient Roman virtue
  - Discernment – Ability to obtain sharp perceptions
  - Duty – Commitment or expectation to act
  - Elevation (emotion) – Emotion elicited by witnessing virtuous acts
  - Fairness
  - Faith – Belief in the teachings of a religion
  - Freedom
  - Flourishing – Positive psychological and social functioning
  - Giri – Duty as one of the Japanese values
  - Glory – High renown or praise
  - Good faith – Intention to be fair, open, and honest
  - Goodness
  - Gravitas – Ancient Roman virtue
  - Happiness – Positive emotional state
  - Heroism – Person or character who combats adversity
  - Honor – Concept of worthiness and respectability
  - Hope – Optimistic state of mind
  - Humor – Tendency of experiences to provoke laughter and provide amusement
  - Hygiene – Practices performed to preserve health
  - Impartiality – Principle of justice holding that decisions should be based on objective criteria
  - Independence – Condition of a nation with self-governance
  - Individualism – Political and social philosophy emphasizing the individual
  - Innocence – Absence of guilt, also a legal term, and a lack of experience
  - Integrity – Moral virtue and practice
  - Interest – Feeling that causes attention to focus on an object, event or process
  - Jing (philosophy) – Confucianist concept
  - Joy – Feeling of happiness
  - Li – Concept of rite in Chinese philosophy
  - Magnanimity – Virtue of being great of mind and heart
  - Magnificence – Word which means to do something great
  - Meekness – Personality trait of being docile and avoiding violence
  - Mindfulness – Buddhist concept of mindfulness or awareness
  - Modesty – Dress or behavior to avoid sexual attraction
  - Moral courage – Courage to take action for moral reasons
  - Morality – Standard, doctrine or system of conduct
  - Mudita – Sympathetic or vicarious joy in Sanskrit and Pali
  - Nimrata – Sikh virtue of humility or benevolence
  - Nonattachment – Philosophy of avoiding unnecessary pain
  - Nonviolence – Principle or practice of not causing harm to others
  - Openness – Philosophical concept emphasising transparency and collaboration
  - Optimism – Positive mental attitude
  - Orderliness
  - Parrhesia – Rhetoric practice
  - Patriotism – Love and attachment to one's country
  - Peacefulness – State of harmony in the absence of hostility and violence
  - Philotimo – Greek notion of duty and honor
  - Pietas – Ancient Roman virtue
  - Piety – Religious devotion or spirituality
  - Pity – Sympathetic sorrow evoked by the suffering of others
  - Poise – Display of elegant movement, poise, or balance
  - Potential
  - Punctuality – Doing something at or before a previously designated time
  - Purity
  - Religion
  - Remembrance – Greek goddess of memory
  - Responsibility – Concept in ethics
  - Righteous indignation – Emotion
  - Righteousness – State of being morally correct and justifiable
  - Sadaqah – Charity in Islam
  - Saddhā – Important element of the teachings of the Buddha
  - Santokh – Contentment, one of five virtues that is promoted in Sikhism
  - Satya – Sanskrit word and a virtue in Indian religions
  - Shaucha – Cleanliness in Indic religions and yoga
  - Self-esteem – Human emotional need
  - Self-reliance – Political and social philosophy emphasizing the individual
  - Self-transcendence – Psychological concept: expansion of personal boundaries
  - Sensitivity – Process that distinguishes an organism's sensory information
  - Silence – Spiritual practice
  - Sincerity – Virtue of honest and genuine communication
  - Sophrosyne – Ancient Greek concept of an ideal of excellence of character and soundness of mind
  - Śraddhā – Sanskrit term, meaning faith; used in Hinduism
  - Spirituality – Philosophical and theological term
  - Stability
  - Subsidiarity – Principle of social organization
  - Taste – Personal and cultural pattern of choice and preference
  - Tranquility – Quality or state of being calm, serene, and worry-free
  - Trust – Assumption of and reliance on the honesty of another party
  - Uniqueness – State or condition wherein someone or something is unlike anything else in comparison
  - Unity
  - Upekṣā – Concept of equanimity in Buddhism
  - Virtus – Masculine virtue in Ancient Rome
  - Vigilance – Concept and field of study in psychology
  - Wealth – Abundance of financial assets or possessions
  - Yi – Concept in Confucianism
  - Zest – One's thirst and excitement for living

===== Vices =====
- Anger – emotional response related to one's psychological interpretation of having been threatened. Often it indicates when one's basic boundaries are violated. Some have a learned tendency to react to anger through retaliation. Anger may be utilized effectively when utilized to set boundaries or escape from dangerous situations.
- Jealousy – emotion, and the word typically refers to the negative thoughts and feelings of insecurity, fear, and anxiety over an anticipated loss of something of great personal value, particularly in reference to a human connection. Jealousy often consists of a combination of emotions such as anger, resentment, inadequacy, helplessness and disgust.
- Laziness – disinclination to activity or exertion despite having the ability to do so. It is often used as a pejorative; related terms for a person seen to be lazy include couch potato, slacker, and bludger.
- Selfishness –
- Seven Deadly Sins
  1. Lust – emotion or feeling of intense desire in the body. The lust can take any form such as the lust for knowledge, the lust for sex or the lust for power. It can take such mundane forms as the lust for food as distinct from the need for food.
  2. Gluttony – over-indulgence and over-consumption of food, drink, or wealth items to the point of extravagance or waste. In some Christian denominations, it is considered one of the seven deadly sins—a misplaced desire of food or its withholding from the needy.
  3. Greed – also known as avarice, cupidity, or covetousness, is the inordinate desire to possess wealth, goods, or objects of abstract value with the intent to keep it for one's self, far beyond the dictates of basic survival and comfort. It is applied to a markedly high desire for and pursuit of wealth, status, and power. See also, Greed (deadly sin).
  4. Sloth – spiritual or emotional apathy, neglecting what God has spoken, and being physically and emotionally inactive. It can also be either an outright refusal or merely a carelessness in the performance of one's obligations, especially spiritual, moral or legal obligations. Sloth can also indicate a wasting due to lack of use, concerning a person, place, thing, skill, or intangible ideal that would require maintenance, refinement, or support to continue to exist.
  5. Wrath – also known as "rage", may be described as inordinate and uncontrolled feelings of hatred and anger. Wrath, in its purest form, presents with self-destructiveness, violence, and hate that may provoke feuds that can go on for centuries. Wrath may persist long after the person who did another a grievous wrong is dead. Feelings of anger can manifest in different ways, including impatience, revenge, and self-destructive behavior, such as drug abuse or suicide.
  6. Envy – emotion which "occurs when a person lacks another's superior quality, achievement, or possession and either desires it or wishes that the other lacked it"
  7. Pride – inflated sense of one's personal status or accomplishments, often used synonymously with hubris.
- Vanity – excessive belief in one's own abilities or attractiveness to others.

===== Harmful traits and practices =====
- Abjection
- Abnormal psychology
- Bias
- Crime
- Deception
- Dysfunctional family
- Existential crisis
- Failure
- Grandiosity
- Hubris
- Hypocrisy
- Identity crisis
- Ignorance
- Impostor syndrome
- Narcissism
- Pessimism
- Risk
- Self-abasement
- Self-absorbed
- Self-abuse
- Self-blame
- Self-criticism
- Self-deception
- Self-deprecation
- Self-envy
- Self-estrangement
- Self-handicapping
- Self-harm
- Self-hatred
- Self-immolation
- Self-loathing
- Self-pity
- Self-propaganda
- Self-punishment
- Self-righteousness
- Self-serving
- Self-victimization
- Selfism
- Sexual self-objectification
- Stress
- Suicide

== Personal experience ==
=== Personal life ===
Personal life

==== Stages of life ====
1. Infancy
2. Childhood
3. Adolescence
4. Adulthood
5. Middle age
6. Old age

==== Major life events ====
1. Birth
2. Education
3. Graduation
4. Coming of age
5. Employment
6. Marriage
7. Parenthood
8. Retirement
9. Death

=== Self-actualization ===
Self-actualization –

- Action
- Competence
- Effectiveness
- Efficacy
- Success

==== Maturity ====
Self-management –

- Autodidacticism (self-education)
- Goal
- Goal setting
- Decision making
- Etiquette
- Intention
- Motivation
- Personal budget
- Personal development
- Personal finance
- Problem solving
- Self-actualization
- Self-assessment
- Self-awareness
  - Introspection
- Self-compassion
- Self-concealment
- Self-consciousness
- Self-control
- Self-defense
- Self-development
- Self-discipline
- Self-disclosure
- Self-discovery
- Self-efficacy
- Self-enhancement
- Self-estimated
- Self-gratification
- Self-help
- Self-interest
- Self-justification
- Self-knowledge
- Self-love
- Self-monitoring
- Self-reflection
- Self-regulated learning
- Self-respect
- Self-sufficiency
- Self-verification
- Stress management
- Time management

==== Self-preservation and self-maintenance ====
- Enlightened self-interest
- Health
- Housekeeping
- Life extension
- Personal hygiene
- Personal safety
- Physical fitness
- Self-care
- Self-preservation
- Well-being

== Individual rights ==
Individual rights – much of the western world values the concept of individual rights. These rights vary from culture to culture, and by very definition, from person to person, and appear mainly in individualist societies. In considering the self, the most intimate legal relation would be what is codified as 'sui juris', or what laws have a purposed place so far as they are derived of the self. In such cultures, it is generally considered that each and every individual has the following rights:

- Security rights – protect people against crimes such as abuse, murder, massacre, and torture
  - Security of person – liberty, including the right, if one is imprisoned unlawfully, to the remedy of habeas corpus. Security of person can also be seen as an expansion of rights based on prohibitions of torture and cruel and unusual punishment. Rights to security of person can guard against less lethal conduct, and can be used in regard to prisoners' rights.
- Bodily and property rights – encompass "ownership" of your own body and choosing what to do with it, as well as the fruits of the labour that spring forth from using your own body. ("Every man has a property in his own person. This nobody has a right to, but himself," per John Locke, Second Treatise on Civil Government)
  - Self-ownership – moral or natural right of a person to have bodily integrity, and be the exclusive controller of his own body and life. Also known as "sovereignty of the individual", "individual sovereignty", and "individual autonomy".
- Liberty rights of the Classical era – protect freedoms in areas such as belief and religion, association, assembling, movement, and other self-determination (as an individual person), privacy from government and others, and freedoms from other paternalist meddling generally, whether by governments or others; also encompasses security, bodily and property, political, and due process rights, many group rights, some welfare rights, and (especially outside of the US in the Classical era) equality rights, as all of those categories appear in this list
- Political rights – protect the liberty to participate in politics by expressing themselves, protesting, voting and serving in public office
- Due process rights – protect against abuses of the legal system such as imprisonment without trial, secret trials and excessive punishments; often overlaps with the bodily rights, listed above
- Equality rights – guarantee equal citizenship, equality before the law and nondiscrimination in regards to one's eligibility for all of the other rights in this list
- Welfare rights (also known as economic or social rights) – require the provision of education and protections against severe poverty and starvation; generally an expansion of positive liberties
- Group rights – provide protection for groups against ethnic genocide, and self-determination (as a group) and the ownership by countries of their national territories and resources; may overlap with the bodily and property rights, and Social equality rights, listed above

== Other personal concepts ==
- Ability
- Aptitude
- Attitude
- Behavior
- Competence
- Compassion
- Character traits
- Chronotype
  - Early bird
  - Night owl
- Common sense
- Communication skills
- Duty
- Everyday life
- Egocentrism
- Egoism
- Emotional intelligence
- Ethics
  - Good and evil
- Freedom (philosophy)
- Freedom (political)
- Free will
- Harm principle
- Human sexual behavior
- Human sexuality
- Humanism
- Improvement
- Individualism
- Individuality
- Individuation
- Interest
- Intrapersonal communication
- Justice
- Liberty
- Lifestyle (List)
  - Lifestyle disease
- Luck
- Meaning of life
- Morality
- Occupational disease
- Ownership
- Parenting
- People skills
- Personal boundaries
- Personal income
- Personal life
- Note-taking
- Personal property
- Personal space
- Personal time
- Philosophy
- Privacy
- Property
- Proxemics
- Psychological stress
- Public
- Reputation
- Self-talk
- Self-schema
- Self-worth
- Social influence
- Social intelligence
- Soft skills
- Study skills
- Subjectivity
- Success
- Taste (aesthetics)
- Taste (sociology)
- Temperament
- Thought
- Transhumanism

== See also ==
- Collaboration
- Cosmos
- Cosmology
- Externality
- List of cognitive biases
- Outline of social science
- Rite of passage
- Social behavior
- Trade-off
