= Self-propaganda =

Form of cognitive bias

Self-propaganda is the way in which people convince themselves of something regardless of the evidence against it. They will go over their side of the argument without considering the alternative arguments.

== Introduction ==
Self-propaganda is a form of propaganda and indoctrination performed by an individual or a group on oneself. It functions at individual and social levels: political, economic, and religious. It hides behind partial truths and ignores questions of critical thought.

The psychological process of utilizing self-propaganda can negatively influence values and beliefs, and subsequent perceptions and judgments, thus becoming a self-fulfilling prophecy. Self-propaganda can also be a form of self-deception. Those whose values match the self deceptions are even further impacted. Confirmation bias and cognitive dissonance can cause people to further perpetuate the propaganda, reaffirming or reinforcing their beliefs despite contradicting evidence.

== Historical context ==
Propaganda is most successful when self- propaganda is also involved. Self-propaganda makes it easier for individuals to justify their own actions as well as the actions of others. This can be due in part to the fact that belief in actions can greatly reduce cognitive dissonance. Historically propaganda is widely associated with wartime measures and justifications. One of the most well-known examples of propaganda's ability to allow individuals to convince themselves is During World-War 2. At this time Nazi Germany had large propaganda campaigns against the Jews. While self propaganda does make such government efforts of propaganda more effective, self-propaganda can also refer to any lie that individuals tell themselves or becomes convinced of.

== Examples ==
=== Filter bubbles ===
A social media filter bubble or "Algorithmic editing" is created by joining a group that limits what information can be seen within a certain group. In 2016, Facebook came under criticism for doing this, showing users posts that reflect with what they already believe and agree with. Speculation arose that Facebook was polarizing users for the 2016 United States presidential election, and was further developing their bias towards their preconceived beliefs.

=== Confirmation bias ===
Confirmation bias often manifests through self-verification and self-enhancement. People are less likely to remember information that conflicts their beliefs or appears negative to what they expect.

=== Communal reinforcement ===
Communal reinforcement is the repeated assertion within a group about a belief that the group takes for truth. Often this is done without fully researching the subject or gathering supporting evidence. A beneficial use for this form could be self/group motivation. A group of Alcoholic's Anonymous reaffirming one another that they are strong and can conquer their addiction is a positive form of communal reinforcement.

=== Echo chambers ===
Echo chambers form when members within a group obtain information only from within their group. While a filter bubble is created by algorithms online, echo chambers are created by people purposely choosing who they associate with and from whom they receive their information. American psychology professor Nicholas DiFonzo found that when Republicans and Democrats were separated and asked to discuss rumors about the other party, they would polarize. However, as the groups were mixed, polarization was significantly decreased.

Online forums, such as Reddit, have often been associated with echo chambers. A group known as "incels" has received much media attention. This group of "involuntarily celibate" individuals would post often about how they felt they were being wronged by society for what they viewed as bad genetics. Some were pushed into extremism thoughts, and a few committed mass murders.

== Application to cognitive psychology ==
Self-propaganda is closely related to self-deception and cognitive dissonance.

== See also ==
- Doublethink
- Group polarization
- Outline of self
- Self-deception
- Ingroup bias
- Echo chamber (media)
