= Self-perception theory =

Account of attitude formation developed by psychologist Daryl Bem

Self-perception theory (SPT) is an account of attitude formation developed by psychologist Daryl Bem. It asserts that people develop their attitudes (when there is no previous attitude due to a lack of experience, etc.—and the emotional response is ambiguous) by observing their own behavior and concluding what attitudes must have caused it. The theory is counterintuitive in nature, as the conventional wisdom is that attitudes determine behaviors. Furthermore, the theory suggests that people induce attitudes without accessing internal cognition and mood states. The person interprets their own overt behaviors rationally in the same way they attempt to explain others' behaviors.

== Bem's original experiment ==
In an attempt to decide if individuals induce their attitudes as observers without accessing their internal states, Bem used interpersonal simulations, in which an "observer-participant" is given a detailed description of one condition of a cognitive dissonance experiment. Subjects listened to a tape of a man enthusiastically describing a tedious peg-turning task.

Subjects were told that the man had been paid $20 for his testimonial and another group was told that he was paid $1. Those in the latter condition thought that the man must have enjoyed the task more than those in the $20 condition. The results obtained were similar to the original Festinger–Carlsmith experiment. Because the observers, who did not have access to the actors' internal cognition and mood states, were able to infer the true attitude of the actors, it is possible that the actors themselves also arrive at their attitudes by observing their own behavior. Specifically, Bem notes how "the attitude statements which comprise the major dependent variables in dissonance experiments may be regarded as interpersonal judgments in which the observer and the observed happen to be the same individual."

== Further evidence ==
There are numerous studies conducted by psychologists that support the self-perception theory, demonstrating that emotions do follow behaviors. For example, it is found that corresponding emotions (including liking, disliking, happiness, anger, etc.) were reported following from their overt behaviors, which had been manipulated by the experimenters. These behaviors included making different facial expressions, gazes, and postures. In the end of the experiment, subjects inferred and reported their affections and attitudes from their practiced behaviors despite the fact that they were told previously to act that way. These findings are consistent with the James–Lange theory of emotion.

In 1974, James Laird conducted two experiments on how changes in facial expression can trigger changes in emotion. Participants were asked to contract or relax various facial muscles, causing them to smile or frown without awareness of the nature of their expressions. Participants reported feeling more angry when frowning and happier when smiling. They also reported that cartoons viewed while they were smiling were more humorous than cartoons viewed while they were frowning. Furthermore, participants scored higher on aggression during frown trials than during smile trials, and scored higher on elation, surgency, and social affection factors during smile trials than during frown ones. Laird interpreted these results as "indicating that an individual's expressive behavior mediates the quality of his emotional experience." In other words, a person's facial expression can act as a cause of an emotional state, rather than an effect; instead of smiling because they feel happy, a person can make themselves feel happy by smiling.

In 2006, Tiffany Ito and her colleagues conducted two studies to investigate if changes in facial expression can trigger changes in racial bias. The explicit goal of the studies was to determine "whether facial feedback can modulate implicit racial bias as assessed by the Implicit Association Test (IAT)." Participants were surreptitiously induced to smile through holding a pencil in their mouth while viewing photographs of unfamiliar black or white males or performed no somatic configuration while viewing the photographs (Study 1 only). All participants then completed the IAT with no facial manipulation. Results revealed a spreading attitude effect; people made to smile (unconsciously) at pictures of black males showed less implicit prejudice than those made to smile at pictures of white males. Their attitudes change as a result of their behavior.

Chaiken and Baldwin's 1981 study on self-perception theory dealt with environmental attitudes. Each participant was identified as having well or poorly defined prior attitudes toward being an environmentalist or conservationist. Participants then completed one of two versions of a questionnaire designed to bring to mind either past pro-ecology behaviors or past anti-ecology behaviors. For example, questions such as "Have you ever recycled?" call to mind the times an individual has recycled, emphasizing their engagement in environmentalist behavior. On the other hand, questions like "Do you always recycle?" bring to mind all the times an individual did not recycle something, emphasizing a lack of environmentalist behavior. Afterward, participants' attitudes toward being an environmentalist/conservationist were re-measured. Those with strong initial/prior attitudes toward the environment were not really affected by the salient manipulation. Those with weak prior attitudes, however, were affected. At the end, those in the pro-ecology condition ("Have you ever recycled?") reported themselves as being much more pro-environment than those in the anti-ecology condition ("Do you always recycle?"). Bringing to mind certain past behaviors affected what people believed their attitudes to be.

Evidence for the self-perception theory has also been seen in real life situations. After teenagers participated in repeated and sustained volunteering services, their attitudes were demonstrated to have shifted to be more caring and considerate towards others.

== Recent research ==
Research incorporating self-perception theory has continued in recent years, appearing in conjunction with studies dealing with motivational "crowding out," terrorism, mindwandering, and the inclusion of others in the self.

Guadagno and her fellow experimenters did a study in 2010 addressing the recruitment of new members by terrorist organization via the internet. In addition to looking at how such an organization might influence its targets to support more extreme ideologies (primarily through simple requests gradually increasing to larger commitments–an example of the foot-in-the-door technique), the authors looked at how "the new converts may form increasingly radical attitudes to be consistent with their increasingly radical behavior." Self-perception theory, then, has strong ties to social identity and social influence in this scenario.

Also in 2010, Clayton Critcher and Thomas Gilovich performed four studies to test a connection between self-perception theory and mindwandering. Self-perception theory posits that people determine their attitudes and preferences by interpreting the meaning of their own behavior. Critcher and Gilovich looked at whether people also rely on the unobservable behavior that is their mindwandering when making inferences about their attitudes and preferences. They found that "Having the mind wander to positive events, to concurrent as opposed to past activities, and to many events rather than just one tends to be attributed to boredom and therefore leads to perceived dissatisfaction with an ongoing task." Participants relied on the content of their wandering minds as a cue to their attitudes unless an alternative cause for their mindwandering was brought to their attention.

Similarly, Goldstein and Cialdini published work related to self-perception theory in 2007. In an extension of self-perception theory, the authors hypothesized that people sometimes infer their own attributes or attitudes by "observing the freely chosen actions of others with whom they feel a sense of merged identity – almost as if they had observed themselves performing the acts." Participants were made to feel a sense of merged identity with an actor through a perspective-taking task or feedback indicating overlapping brainwave patterns. Participants incorporated attributes relevant to the actor's behavior into their own self-concepts, leading participants to then change their own behaviors. The study addresses the self-expansion model: close relationships can lead to an inclusion of another person in an individual's sense of self.

== Applications ==
One useful application of the self-perception theory is in changing attitude, in psychological therapy, marketing, and education.

=== Psychological therapy ===
For therapies, self-perception theory holds a different view of psychological problems from the traditional perspectives. Traditionally, psychological problems come from the inner part of the clients. However, self-perception theory perspective suggests that people derive their inner feelings or abilities from their external behaviors. If those behaviors are maladjusted ones, people will attribute those maladjustments to their poor adapting abilities and thus suffer from the corresponding psychological problems. Thus, this concept can be used to treat clients with psychological problems that resulted from maladjustments by guiding them to first change their behavior and later dealing with the "problems".

One of the most famous therapies making use of this concept is therapy for "heterosocial anxiety". In this case, the assumption is that an individual perceives that he or she has poor social skills because he/she has no dates. Experiments showed that males with heterosocial anxiety perceived less anxiety with females after several sessions of therapy in which they engaged in a 12-minute, purposefully biased dyadic social interactions with a separate females. From these apparently successful interactions, the males inferred that their heterosocial anxiety was reduced. This effect is shown to be quite long-lasting as the reduction in perceived heterosocial anxiety resulted in a significantly greater number of dates among subjects 6 months later.

=== Marketing and persuasion ===
Self-perception theory is also an underlying mechanism for the effectiveness of many marketing or persuasive techniques. One typical example is the foot-in-the-door technique, which is a widely used marketing technique for persuading target customers to buy products. The basic premise of this technique is that, once a person complies with a small request (e.g. filling in a short questionnaire), he/she will be more likely to comply with a more substantial request which is related to the original request (e.g. buying the related product). The idea is that the initial commitment on the small request will change one's self-image, therefore giving reasons for agreeing with the subsequent, larger request. It is because people observe their own behaviors (paying attention to and complying with the initial request) and the context in which they behave (no obvious incentive to do so), and thus infer they must have a preference for those products.

=== Education ===
Self-perception theory has meaningful implications in educational contexts. Studies on technology integration in educational programs suggest that students' perception of their own learning with technology can promote the integration of technological tools by shaping their attitudes towards technology use in educational settings. Furthermore, repeated and prolonged use of technology by teachers has been shown to increase their positivity towards TPACK (Technology, Pedagogy and Content Knowledge) domains and reduce challenges in teaching. Overall, students' and educational authorities' positive self-perceptions regarding TPACK are considered crucial for the development and implementation of technology-mediated educational programs.

== Challenges and criticisms ==
Self-perception theory was initially proposed as an alternative to explain the experimental findings of the cognitive dissonance theory, and there were debates as to whether people experience attitude changes as an effort to reduce dissonance or as a result of self-perception processes. Based on the fact that the self-perception theory differs from the cognitive dissonance theory in that it does not hold that people experience a "negative drive state" called "dissonance" which they seek to relieve, the following experiment was carried out to compare the two theories under different conditions.

An early study on cognitive dissonance theory shows that people indeed experience arousal when their behavior is inconsistent with their previous attitude. Waterman designed an experiment in which 77 male college freshmen were asked to write an essay arguing against the position they actually agreed with. Then they were asked immediately to perform a simple task and a difficult task; their performance in both tasks was assessed. It was found that they performed better in the simple task and worse in the difficult task, compared to those who had just written an essay corresponding to their true attitude. As indicated by social facilitation, enhanced performance in simple tasks and worsened performance in difficult tasks shows that arousal is produced by people when their behavior is inconsistent with their attitude. Therefore, the cognitive dissonance theory is evident in this case.

== Apparent disproof ==
Debate ensued over whether dissonance or self-perception was the valid mechanism behind attitude change. The chief difficulty lay in finding an experiment where the two flexible theories would make distinctly different predictions. Some prominent social psychologists such as Anthony Greenwald thought it would be impossible to distinguish between the two theories.

In 1974, Zanna and Cooper conducted an experiment in which individuals were made to write a counter-attitudinal essay. They were divided into either a low choice or a high choice condition. They were also given a placebo; they were told the placebo would induce either tension, relaxation, or exert no effect. Under low choice, all participants exhibited no attitude change, which would be predicted by both cognitive dissonance theory and self-perception theory. Under high choice, participants who were told the placebo would produce tension exhibited no attitude change, and participants who were told the placebo would produce relaxation demonstrated larger attitude change.

These results are not explainable by self-perception theory, as arousal should have nothing to do with the mechanism underlying attitude change. Cognitive dissonance theory, however, was readily able to explain these results: if the participants could attribute their state of unpleasant arousal to the placebo, they would not have to alter their attitude.

== Truce experiment ==
Fazio, Zanna, and Cooper conducted another experiment in 1977, demonstrating that both cognitive dissonance and self-perception could co-exist.

In an experimental design similar to Zanna and Cooper's 1974 study, another variable was manipulated: whether or not the stance of the counter-attitudinal essay fell in the latitude of acceptance or the latitude of rejection (see social judgment theory). It appeared that when the stance of the essay fell into the latitude of rejection, the results favoured cognitive dissonance. However, when the essay fell in the latitude of acceptance, the results favoured self-perception theory.

Whether cognitive dissonance or self-perception is a more useful theory is a topic of considerable controversy and a large body of literature. There are some circumstances in which a certain theory is preferred, but it is traditional to use the terminology of cognitive dissonance theory by default. The cognitive dissonance theory accounts for attitude changes when people's behaviors are inconsistent with their original attitudes which are clear and important to them; meanwhile, the self-perception theory is used when those original attitudes are relatively ambiguous and less important. Studies have shown that, in contrast to traditional belief, a large proportion of people's attitudes are weak and vague. Thus, the self-perception theory is significant in interpreting one's own attitudes, such as the assessment of one's own personality traits and whether someone would cheat to achieve a goal.

According to G. Jademyr and Yojiyfus, the perception of different aspect in the interpreting theory can be due to many factors, such as circumstances regarding dissonance and controversy. This can also be because of balance theory as it applies to the attitude towards accountability and dimensions.

== See also ==
- Attitude change
- Outline of self
- Gaslighting
- Overjustification effect
- Self-knowledge (psychology)
- Self-schema
- Social comparison theory
