= Future self =

Research that examines the processes of thinking of oneself in the future

In the psychology of self, the future self concerns the processes and consequences associated with thinking about oneself in the future. People think about their future selves similarly to how they think about other people. The extent to which people feel psychologically connected (e.g., similarity, closeness) to their future self influences how well they treat their future self. When people feel connected to their future self, they are more likely to save for retirement, make healthy decisions, and avoid ethical transgressions. Interventions that increase feelings of connectedness with future selves can improve future-oriented decision making across these domains.

== Philosophical foundations ==
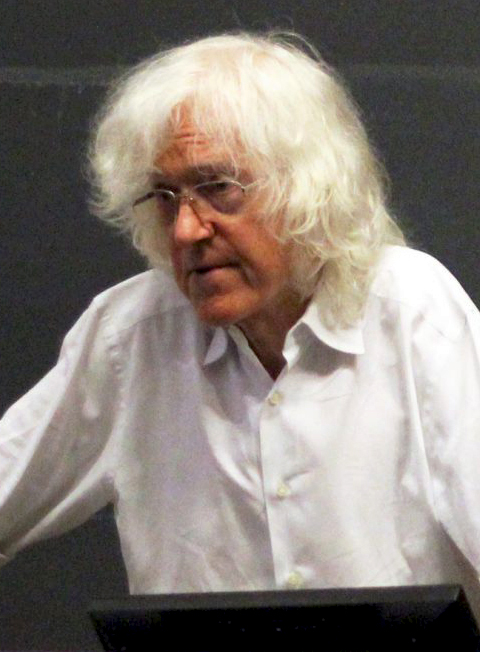
Derek Parfit influenced the psychological research on the future self.

Psychological research on the future self often attributes its theoretical foundations to the philosopher Derek Parfit. Parfit argued that people might differ in the extent to which they feel similar and connected to themselves in the future. Under Parfit's conceptualization, people act rationally by basing their concern for their future on the degree of connectedness between present and future selves. According to Parfit, it is rational for people who perceive very little connectedness with their future self to act in ways that neglect the future self (e.g., by smoking).

The psychological work that followed did not similarly argue for Parfit's normative view but has instead attempted to test the descriptive validity of Parfit's theory.

Daniel Kolak has extensively criticized the idea of the existence of a future self. In his book I am You, Kolak describes three opposing philosophical views regarding the continuity of consciousness: Closed individualism, Empty individualism, and Open individualism. Closed Individualism is defined as the default common sense view of identity where one's identity consists of a line stretching across time, which Kolak, argues is incoherent. Empty Individualism is the view that one's identity only exists for an infinitesimally small amount of time, and an individual person has an entirely different identity from moment to moment. Kolak instead advocates for Open Individualism, which is the view that everyone is in reality the same being, and that the "self" doesn't actually exist at all, similar to anattā in Buddhist philosophy.

== Psychological theory ==
Social psychological and neurological evidence suggests that people think about themselves in the future similarly to how they think about other people. Just as feeling close to others increases prosocial giving, feeling close to one's future self motivates people to delay present gratification in order to benefit themselves in the future.

=== Measuring psychological connectedness ===
Shane Frederick initially tested whether the degree of connectedness with the future self is associated with less discounting of future benefits (in dollar amounts and time). Asking subjects how similar they felt to their future selves on a 1-100 scale, Frederick did not find a statistically significant relationship between the degree of connectedness and discounting of future benefits. However, later researchers argued Frederick did not find a connection because of the way he measured connectedness.

In 2009, Hal Hershfield and colleagues introduced a new measurement of psychological connectedness by adapting the Inclusion of Other in the Self Scale, where the relationship between present and future selves is depicted with seven pairs of successively overlapping circles. Using this measurement, Hershfield, as well as Daniel Bartels and Oleg Urminsky, have now demonstrated a robust relationship between psychological connectedness and discount rates. The more psychologically connectedness people feel between present and future selves, the more they care about the future, and the more they discount present benefits.

=== Manipulating psychological connectedness ===
The research that followed showed systematic ways to enhance psychological connectedness. Experiments have manipulated connectedness by having participants:

1. Interact with a visual depiction of their future self (increased connectedness)
2. List ways in which they expect to be similar to themselves in the future (increased connectedness)
3. Expect an upcoming event (e.g., college graduation) to fundamentally change who they are (decreased connectedness)

The randomized experiments revealed a causal relationship between feeling connected to one's future self and subsequently making more patient long-term decisions.

== Policy applications ==
=== Finances ===
In one of the first experiments to enhance psychological connectedness with the future self, participants were given immersive virtual reality technology and instructed to look at themselves in a virtual mirror. The experimenters randomized whether participants saw an age-progressed version of themselves (meant to look approximately 70 years old) or a current-aged self. Participants that interacted with their future self were more likely to delay present monetary rewards and indicated greater intentions to save for retirement. Leveraging the insights from this experiment, firms such as Merrill Lynch have since adopted web applications with age-progressing software in order to increase retirement savings.

The finding has been conceptually replicated with multiple diverse samples. In one field experiment, students from economically diverse backgrounds that had weekly interactions with an avatar of their future self demonstrated heightened performance during a financial education course. A team of researchers, in collaboration with Ideas42, launched another replication with thousands of Mexican citizens. Before deciding whether to sign-up for an automatic savings account, the treatment group was asked to spend time vividly imagining their lives in the distant future. Compared to a 1% take up rate in the control condition, 3% of people in the treatment condition enrolled in the automatic savings account.

The effect of psychological connectedness on financial decision making is moderated by knowledge about future outcomes. When people are unaware of their future financial needs, regardless of how connected they feel, they are unlikely to save for the future. Similarly, people that have full information about the consequences of their financial actions will only save if they also feel connectedness with their future self. The researchers argue that policy makers who provide information to consumers on retirement savings should also consider simultaneously enhancing psychological connectedness. People are most likely to save rather than spend when they are knowledgeable about the outcomes of their decisions and feel connected to their future selves.

In 2017, the Consumer Financial Protection Bureau included a measure of psychological connectedness to the future self in its first Financial Wellbeing Survey.

=== Health ===
Applying the existing theory, researchers hypothesized that increasing feelings of connectedness with the future self should cause people to make healthier dieting and exercising decisions. Correlational evidence suggests that feeling psychologically connected to the future self corresponds with greater self-reported health. In randomized experiments, participants that wrote in detail about a distant future self were more likely to exercise in the days following the intervention.

=== Ethicality ===
People engage in ethically dubious behavior because they tend to neglect the potential future consequences of their behavior, but feeling connected to one's future self should lead them to discount the future less and thus avoid ethical transgressions. Experiments have found that assigning participants to write about their future selves can decrease support for unethical negotiation strategies. In another set of experiments, after interacting with a 40-year old version of themselves in immersive virtual reality, college students were less likely to cheat on a following task. In a field experiment in the Netherlands, high schoolers that received texts from an avatar of their future self were less likely to engage in delinquent and anti-social behavior.

== Related constructs ==
=== Possible selves ===
Future selves are specific ideas about who one might become in the future. Possibles selves include the ideal selves people hope to become, other selves who people could become, and selves people are afraid of becoming. Future selves can serve as a roadmap to guide individuals from where they are in the present to where they imagine being in the future.

However, in cognitive psychology, the future self is one type of a broader concept called 'possible selves'. These possible selves are psychological schema representing multiple alternative versions of the self, encompassing past and future selves that together characterise regrets, doubts, hopes, worries, and fantasies about who we may have been previously and who we may become.

The way individuals envision their possible selves influences their behaviour and its outcomes. For example, when the future selves of a subject are indicative of unattainable fantasies, rather than reasonable expectations, effort and performance are lower across educational, dating, and medical contexts.

Identifying and exploring their possible selves with a therapist is one strategy by which clients pursue positive cognitive, emotional, and behavioural change in psychotherapy. An example of a technique that endeavours to facilitate this exploration can be seen in the work of British psychotherapist Paul Newham, who encourages clients to use creative writing and dramatic characterisation to express and personify past and future selves, in order to subsequently interpret their psychological significance.

=== Want-should conflicts ===
Want-should conflicts refer to internal conflicts between one's want self and one's should self. The theory assumes people simultaneously hold two sets of preferences; one associated with their want self (i.e., present-focused, hedonistic) and one associated with their should self (i.e., future-focused, utilitarian). Interventions that seek to increase patient decision making, for example, can use commitment devices to ensure people act on their should preferences and avoid succumbing to their want preferences.

=== Delayed gratification ===
Enhancing psychological connectedness to the future self can improve ability to delay gratification. Walter Mischel devoted a chapter to the future self in his book, The Marshmallow Test.

== See also ==
- Anattā – Buddhist doctrine of "non-self"
- Discounting – When a creditor delays payments from a debtor in exchange for a fee
- Identity – Qualities, beliefs, personality, looks and/or expressions that distinguish a person
- Intertemporal choice – Study of how people choose between payoffs at different times
- Open individualism – Theory of personal identity
- Personal identity – Philosophical idea of a person having a unique existence
- Self-concept – One's internal beliefs about oneself
- Teletransportation paradox – Thought experiment on the philosophy of identity
- Vertiginous question – Philosophical question about personal identity
