= Self-consciousness =

Acute sense of self-awareness, a preoccupation with oneself

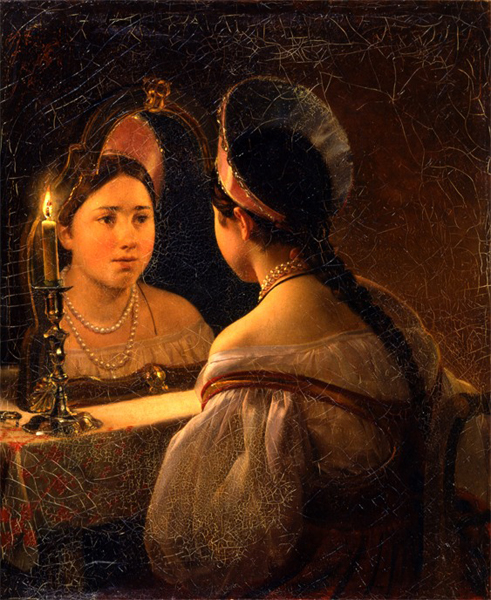
Svetlana reflects herself in the mirror (painting by Karl Briullov, 1836).

Self-consciousness is a heightened sense of awareness of oneself. Historically, "self-consciousness" was synonymous with "self-awareness", referring to a state of awareness that one exists and that one has consciousness. While "self-conscious" and "self-aware" are still sometimes used interchangeably, particularly in philosophy, "self-consciousness" has commonly come to refer to a preoccupation with oneself, especially with how others might perceive one's appearance or one's actions. An unpleasant feeling of self-consciousness may occur when one realizes that one is being watched or observed, the feeling that "everyone is looking" at oneself. Some people are habitually more self-conscious than others. Unpleasant feelings of self-consciousness sometimes become associated with shyness or paranoia.

Notable opponents of self-consciousness include Thomas Carlyle.

== Impairment ==
When feeling self-conscious, one becomes aware of even the smallest of one's own actions. Such awareness can impair one's ability to perform complex actions. Adolescence is believed to be a time of heightened self-consciousness. A person with a chronic tendency toward self-consciousness may be shy or introverted.

== Psychology ==
Unlike self-awareness, which in a philosophical context is being conscious of oneself as an individual, self-consciousness – being excessively conscious of one's appearance or manner – can be a problem at times. Self-consciousness is often associated with shyness and embarrassment, in which case a lack of pride and low self-esteem can result. In a positive context, self-consciousness may affect the development of identity, for it is during periods of high self-consciousness that people come the closest to knowing themselves objectively. Self-consciousness affects people in varying degrees, as some people are constantly self-monitoring or self-involved, while others are completely oblivious about themselves.

Psychologists frequently distinguish between two kinds of self-consciousness, private and public. Private self-consciousness is a tendency to introspect and examine one's inner self and feelings. Public self-consciousness is an awareness of the self as it is viewed by others. This kind of self-consciousness can result in self-monitoring and social anxiety. Both private and public self-consciousness are viewed as personality traits that are relatively stable over time, but they are not correlated. Just because an individual is high on one dimension does not mean that they are high on the other.

Different levels of self-consciousness affect behavior, as it is common for people to act differently when they "lose themselves in a crowd". Being in a crowd, being in a dark room, or wearing a disguise creates anonymity and temporarily decreases self-consciousness (see deindividuation). This can lead to uninhibited, sometimes destructive behavior.

== See also ==
- Alterity
- Introspection
- Looking glass self
- Personal identity
- Self-awareness
- Self-concept
- Self-knowledge (psychology)
- Shyness
- Surveillance
