= Self-abuse =

Self-abuse may refer to:

- Self-inflicted wound, harm to one's own body
  - Self-harm, the intentional, direct injuring of one's own body without suicidal intentions
- Self-destructive behavior, patterns of behavior to inflict metaphorical or literal harm on oneself
- A dysphemism for masturbation

== See also ==
- Algolagnia, deriving sexual pleasure and stimulation from physical pain
- Abuse § Self-abuse
- Violence § Self-directed violence
