= Religious views on the self =

Religious views on the self vary widely. The self is a complex and core subject in many forms of spirituality. Considering the self leads to questions about who we are and the nature of our own importance.

== Overview ==
According to psychologist James Marcia, identity comes from both political and religious views. Marcia also identified exploration and commitment as interactive parts of identity formation, which includes religious identity. Erik Erikson compared faith with doubt and found that healthy adults take heed to their spiritual side.

One description of spirituality is the self's search for "ultimate meaning" through an independent comprehension of the sacred. Spiritual identity appears when the symbolic religious and spiritual of a culture is found by individuals in the setting of their own life. There can be different types of spiritual self because it is determined on one's life and experiences. Another definition of spiritual identity is "a persistent sense of self that addresses ultimate questions about the nature, purpose, and meaning of life, resulting in behaviors that are consonant with the individual’s core values." Another description of mind, body, soul, and spirit is a holism of one inner self being of one whole. It all combines together as one whole instead of different parts. Individuals one thoughts, one feeling, one breathing is all completed and occurs as one whole.

== Views in Eastern religions ==
Some Eastern philosophies reject the self as a delusion. In Buddhist psychology, the attachment to self is an illusion that serves as the main cause of suffering and unhappiness.

== Christian views ==
=== Evelyn Underhill ===
Catholic mystic Evelyn Underhill wrote:

It is clear that under ordinary conditions, and save for sudden gusts of "Transcendental Feeling" induced by some saving madness such as Religion, Art, or Love, the superficial self knows nothing of the attitude of this silent watcher—this "Dweller in the Innermost"—towards the incoming messages of the external world: nor of the activities which they awake in it. Concentrated on the sense-world, and the messages she receives from it, she knows nothing of the relations which exist between this subject and the unattainable Object of all thought. But by a deliberate inattention to the messages of the senses, such as that which is induced by contemplation, the mystic can bring the ground of the soul, the seat of "Transcendental Feeling," within the area of consciousness: making it amenable to the activity of the will. Thus becoming unaware of his usual and largely fictitious "external world," another and more substantial set of perceptions, which never have their chance under normal conditions, rise to the surface. Sometimes these unite with the normal reasoning faculties. More often, they supersede them. Some such exchange, such "losing to find," appears to be necessary, if man's transcendental powers are to have their full chance.

=== Albert Outler ===
According to Methodist theologian Albert Outler, the "desperately wicked self" is the sinful self that has chosen to be "curved back upon itself", but ever with the potential of changing and (by God's grace) turning toward "'new life', opened out to love of God and neighbor".

== Ken Wilber's view ==
American author Ken Wilber describes the Witnessing (or Observing) Self in the following terms:

"This observing Self is usually called the Self with a capital S, or the Witness, or pure Presence, or pure Awareness, or Consciousness as such, and this Self as transparent Witness is a direct ray of the living Divine. The ultimate "I AM" is Christ, is Buddha, is Emptiness itself: such is the startling testimony of the world's great mystics and sages."

He adds that the self is not an emergent, but an aspect present from the start as the basic form of awareness, but which becomes increasingly obvious and self-aware "as growth and transcendence matures." As Depth increases, consciousness shines forth more noticeably, until:

"shed[ding] its lesser identification with both the body and the mind ... in each case from matter to body to mind to Spirit... consciousness or the observing Self sheds an exclusive identity with a lesser and shallower dimension, and opens up to deeper and higher and wider occasions, until it opens up to its own ultimate ground in Spirit itself. And the stages of transpersonal growth and development are basically the stages of following this Observing Self to its ultimate abode, which is pure Spirit or pure Emptiness, the ground, path and fruition of the entire display."

== See also ==
- Anattā
- Aseity
- Ātman (Buddhism)
- Ātman (Hinduism)
- Sakshi (Witness)
- Tat tvam asi
- Holy Guardian Angel (Thelema)
- Jiva
- Nondualism
- Philosophy of self
- Psychology of self
- Saṃsāra
- Soul
- Tazkiah
- The Urantia Book
