= Self-knowledge (psychology) =

Understanding of one's own basic needs and motives

Self-knowledge is a term in psychology, describing the information needed for an individual to answer the questions "Who am I?" and "What am I like?".

Self-knowledge requires both self-awareness and self-consciousness (aware of the fact that one is self-aware). While young infants and chimpanzees display some of the traits of self-awareness, agency, and contingency; they are not considered to be self-conscious. At some greater level of cognition, however, a self-conscious component emerges in addition to an increased self-awareness component, and then it becomes possible to ask "What am I like?", and to answer with self-knowledge, though self-knowledge has limits, as introspection has been said to be limited and complex, such as the consciousness of being conscious of oneself.

Self-knowledge is a component of the self or, more accurately, the self-concept. It is the knowledge of oneself and one's properties and the desire to seek such knowledge that guide the development of the self-concept, even if that concept is flawed. Self-knowledge informs us of our mental representations of ourselves, which contain attributes that we uniquely pair with ourselves, and theories on whether these attributes are stable or dynamic, to the best that we can evaluate ourselves.

The self-concept is thought to have three primary aspects:

- The cognitive self
- The affective self
- The executive self

The affective and executive selves are also known as the felt and active selves respectively, as they refer to the emotional and behavioral components of the self-concept. Self-knowledge is linked to the cognitive self in that its motives guide our search to gain greater clarity and assurance that our own self-concept is an accurate representation of our true self; for this reason the cognitive self is also referred to as the known self. The cognitive self is made up of everything we know (or think we know) about ourselves. This implies physiological properties such as hair color, race, and height etc.; and psychological properties like beliefs, values, and dislikes to name but a few. Self knowledge just simply means introspecting your behaviour and actions from a third persons view to the various situations faced in life and then trying to identify the causes of these issues in life.

== Relationship with memory ==
Self-knowledge and its structure affect how events we experience are encoded, how they are selectively retrieved/recalled, and what conclusions we draw from how we interpret the memory. The analytical interpretation of our own memory can also be called meta memory, and is an important factor of meta cognition.

The connection between our memory and our self-knowledge has been recognized for many years by leading minds in both philosophy and psychology, yet the precise specification of the relation remains a point of controversy.

=== Specialized memory ===
- Studies have shown there is a memory advantage for information encoded with reference to the self.
- Somatic markers, that is memories connected to an emotional charge, can be helpful or dysfunctional - there is a correlation but not causation, and therefore cannot be relied on.
- Patients with Alzheimer's who have difficulty recognizing their own family have not shown evidence of self-knowledge.

=== The division of memory ===
Self-theories have traditionally failed to distinguish between different sources that inform self-knowledge, these are episodic memory and semantic memory. Both episodic and semantic memory are facets of declarative memory, which contains memory of facts. Declarative memory is the explicit counterpart to procedural memory, which is implicit in that it applies to skills we have learnt; they are not facts that can be stated.

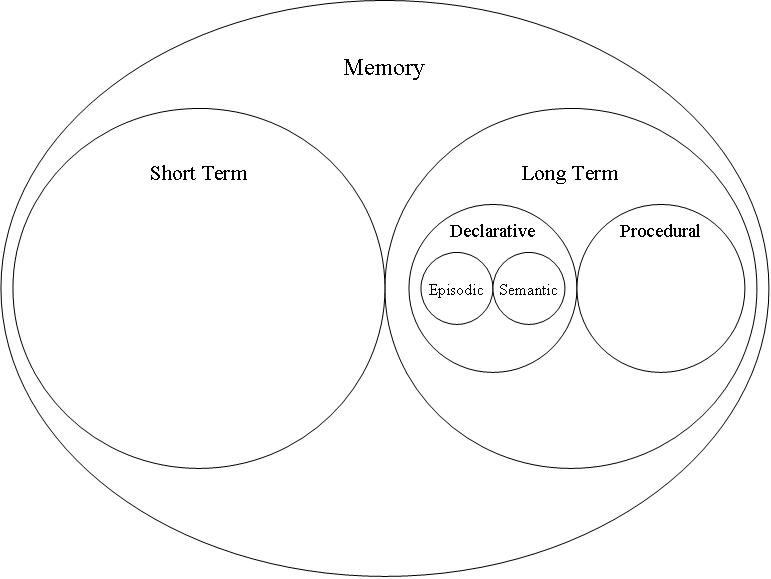
A basic schematic representation of memory showing the 'locations' of semantic and episodic memory.

==== Episodic memory ====
Episodic memory is the autobiographical memory that individuals possess which contains events, emotions, and knowledge associated with a given context.

==== Semantic memory ====
Semantic memory does not refer to concept-based knowledge stored about a specific experience like episodic memory. Instead it includes the memory of meanings, understandings, general knowledge about the world, and factual information etc. This makes semantic knowledge independent of context and personal information. Semantic memory enables an individual to know information, including information about their selves, without having to consciously recall the experiences that taught them such knowledge.

===== Semantic self as the source =====
People are able to maintain a sense of self that is supported by semantic knowledge of personal facts in the absence of direct access to the memories that describe the episodes on which the knowledge is based.

- Individuals have been shown to maintain a sense of self despite catastrophic impairments in episodic recollection. For example, subject W.J., who suffered dense retrograde amnesia leaving her unable to recall any events that occurred prior to the development of amnesia. However, her memory for general facts about her life during the period of amnesia remained intact.

- This suggests that a separate type of knowledge contributes to the self-concept, as W.J.'s knowledge could not have come from her episodic memory.
  - A similar dissociation occurred in K.C. who suffered a total loss of episodic memory, but still knew a variety of facts about himself.
- Evidence also exists that shows how patients with severe amnesia can have accurate and detailed semantic knowledge of what they are like as a person, for example which particular personality traits and characteristics they possess.

This evidence for the dissociation between episodic and semantic self-knowledge has made several things clear:

1. Episodic memory is not the only drawing point for self-knowledge, contrary to long-held beliefs. Self-knowledge must therefore be expanded to include the semantic component of memory.
2. Self-knowledge about the traits one possesses can be accessed without the need for episodic retrieval. This is shown through study of individuals with neurological impairments that make it impossible to recollect trait-related experiences, yet who can still make reliable and accurate trait-ratings of themselves, and even revise these judgements based on new experiences they cannot even recall.

== Motives that guide our search ==
People have goals that lead them to seek, notice, and interpret information about themselves. These goals begin the quest for self-knowledge. There are three primary motives that lead us in the search for self-knowledge:

- Self-enhancement
- Accuracy
- Consistency

=== Self-enhancement ===
Self-enhancement refers to the fact that people seem motivated to experience positive emotional states and to avoid experiencing negative emotional states. People are motivated to feel good about themselves in order to maximize their feelings of self-worth, thus enhancing their self-esteem.
The emphasis on feelings differs slightly from how other theories have previously defined self-enhancement needs, for example the Contingencies of Self-Worth Model.
Other theorists have taken the term to mean that people are motivated to think about themselves in highly favorable terms, rather than feel they are "good".
In many situations and cultures, feelings of self-worth are promoted by thinking of oneself as highly capable or better than one's peers. However, in some situations and cultures, feelings of self-worth are promoted by thinking of oneself as average or even worse than others. In both cases, thoughts about the self still serve to enhance feelings of self-worth. The universal need is not a need to think about oneself in any specific way, rather a need to maximize one's feelings of self-worth. This is the meaning of the self enhancement motive with respect to self-knowledge.

==== Arguments ====
In Western societies, feelings of self-worth are in fact promoted by thinking of oneself in favorable terms.

- In this case, self-enhancement needs lead people to seek information about themselves in such a way that they are likely to conclude that they truly possess what they see as a positive defining quality.

See "Self-verification theory" section.

=== Accuracy ===
Accuracy needs influence the way in which people search for self-knowledge. People frequently wish to know the truth about themselves without regard as to whether they learn something positive or negative. There are three considerations which underlie this need:

- Occasionally people simply want to reduce any uncertainty. They may want to know for the sheer intrinsic pleasure of knowing what they are truly like.
- Some people believe they have a moral obligation to know what they are really like. This view holds particularly strong in theology and philosophy, particularly existentialism.
- Knowing what one is really like can sometimes help an individual to achieve their goals. The basic fundamental goal to any living thing is survival, therefore accurate self-knowledge can be adaptive to survival.

Accurate self-knowledge can also be instrumental in maximizing feelings of self-worth. Success is one of the number of things that make people feel good about themselves, and knowing what we are like can make successes more likely, so self-knowledge can again be adaptive. This is because self-enhancement needs can be met by knowing that one can not do something particularly well, thus protecting the person from pursuing a dead-end dream that is likely to end in failure.

=== Consistency ===
Many theorists believe that we have a motive to protect the self-concept (and thus our self-knowledge) from change. This motive to have consistency leads people to look for and welcome information that is consistent with what they believe to be true about themselves; likewise, they will avoid and reject information which presents inconsistencies with their beliefs. This phenomenon is also known as self-verification theory. Not everyone has been shown to pursue a self-consistency motive; but it has played an important role in various other influential theories, such as cognitive dissonance theory.

==== Self-verification theory ====
This theory was put forward by William Swann of the University of Texas at Austin in 1983 to put a name to the aforementioned phenomena. The theory states that once a person develops an idea about what they are like, they will strive to verify the accompanying self-views. Two considerations are thought to drive the search for self-verifying feedback:

- We feel more comfortable and secure when we believe that others see us in the same way that we see ourselves. Actively seeking self-verifying feedback helps people avoid finding out that they are wrong about their self-views.
- Self-verification theory assumes that social interactions will proceed more smoothly and profitably when other people view us the same way as we view ourselves. This provides a second reason to selectively seek self-verifying feedback.

These factors of self-verification theory create controversy when persons suffering from low-self-esteem are taken into consideration. People who hold negative self-views about themselves selectively seek negative feedback in order to verify their self-views. This is in stark contrast to self-enhancement motives that suggest people are driven by the desire to feel good about themselves.

== Sources ==
=== The social world ===
The comparative nature of self-views means that people rely heavily on the social world when seeking information about their selves. Two particular processes are important: social comparison theory and reflected appraisals.

==== Social comparison ====
People compare attributes with others and draw inferences about what they themselves are like. However, the conclusions a person ultimately draws depend on whom in particular they compare themselves with. The need for accurate self-knowledge was originally thought to guide the social comparison process, and researchers assumed that comparing with others who are similar to us in the important ways is more informative.

===== Complications of the social comparison theory =====
People are also known to compare themselves with people who are slightly better off than they themselves are (known as an upward comparison); and with people who are slightly worse off or disadvantaged (known as a downward comparison). There is also substantial evidence that the need for accurate self-knowledge is neither the only, nor most important factor that guides the social comparison process, the need to feel good about ourselves affects the social comparison process.

==== Reflected appraisals ====
Reflected appraisals occur when a person observes how others respond to them. The process was first explained by the sociologist Charles H. Cooley in 1902 as part of his discussion of the "looking-glass self", which describes how we see ourselves reflected in other peoples' eyes. He argued that a person's feelings towards themselves are socially determined via a three-step process:

"A self-idea of this sort seems to have three principled elements: the imagination of our appearance to the other person; the imagination of his judgment of that appearance; and some sort of self-feeling, such as pride or mortification. The comparison with a looking-glass hardly suggests the second element, the imagined judgment which is quite essential. The thing that moves us to pride or shame is not the mere mechanical reflection of ourselves, but an imputed sentiment, the imagined effect of this reflection upon another's mind." (Cooley, 1902, p. 153)

In simplified terms, Cooley's three stages are:

1. We imagine how we appear in the eyes of another person.
2. We then imagine how that person is evaluating us.
3. The imagined evaluation leads us to feel good or bad, in accordance with the judgement we have conjured.

Note that this model is of a phenomenological nature.

In 1963, John W. Kinch adapted Cooley's model to explain how a person's thoughts about themselves develop rather than their feelings.

===== Arguments against the reflected appraisal models =====
Research has only revealed limited support for the models and various arguments raise their heads:

- People are not generally good at knowing what an individual thinks about them.
  - Felson believes this is due to communication barriers and imposed social norms which place limits on the information people receive from others. This is especially true when the feedback would be negative; people rarely give one another negative feedback, so people rarely conclude that another person dislikes them or is evaluating them negatively.
- Despite being largely unaware of how one person in particular is evaluating them, people are better at knowing what other people on the whole think.
  - The reflected appraisal model

=== The psychological world ===
The psychological world describes our "inner world". There are three processes that influence how people acquire knowledge about themselves:

- Introspection
- Self-perception processes
- Causal attributions

==== Introspection ====
Introspection involves looking inwards and directly consulting our attitudes, feelings and thoughts for meaning. Consulting one's own thoughts and feelings can sometimes result in meaningful self-knowledge. The accuracy of introspection, however, has been called into question since the 1970s. Generally, introspection relies on people's explanatory theories of the self and their world, the accuracy of which is not necessarily related to the form of self-knowledge that they are attempting to assess.

- A stranger's ratings about a participant are more correspondent to the participant's self-assessment ratings when the stranger has been subject to the participant's thoughts and feelings than when the stranger has been subject to the participant's behavior alone, or a combination of the two.

Comparing sources of introspection. People believe that spontaneous forms of thought provide more meaningful self-insight than more deliberate forms of thinking. Morewedge, Giblin, and Norton (2014) found that the more spontaneous a kind of thought, the more spontaneous a particular thought, and the more spontaneous thought a particular thought was perceived to be, the more insight into the self it was attributed to. In addition, the more meaning the thought was attributed to, the more the particular thought influenced their judgment and decision making. When people asked to let their mind wander until they randomly thought of a person to whom they were attracted, for example, it was reported that the person they identified provided them with more self-insight than people asked to simply think of a person to whom they were attracted. Moreover, the greater self-insight attributed to the person identified by the (former) random thought process than by the latter deliberate thought process led those people in the random condition to report feeling more attracted to the person they identified.

===== Arguments against introspection =====
Whether introspection always fosters self-insight is not entirely clear. Thinking too much about why we feel the way we do about something can sometimes confuse us and undermine true self-knowledge. Participants in an introspection condition are less accurate when predicting their own future behavior than controls and are less satisfied with their choices and decisions. In addition, it is important to notice that introspection allows the exploration of the conscious mind only, and does not take into account the unconscious motives and processes, as found and formulated by Freud.

==== Self-perception processes ====
Wilson's work is based on the assumption that people are not always aware of why they feel the way they do. Bem's self-perception theory makes a similar assumption. The theory is concerned with how people explain their behavior. It argues that people don't always know why they do what they do. When this occurs, they infer the causes of their behavior by analyzing their behavior in the context in which it occurred. Outside observers of the behavior would reach a similar conclusion as the individual performing it. The individuals then draw logical conclusions about why they behaved as they did.

"Individuals come to "know" their own attitudes, emotions, and other internal states partially by inferring them from observations of their own overt behavior and/or the circumstances in which this behavior occurs. Thus, to the extent that internal cues are weak, ambiguous, or uninterpretable, the individual is functionally in the same position as an outside observer, an observer who must necessarily rely upon those same external cues to infer the individual's inner states." (Bem, 1972, p.2)

The theory has been applied to a wide range of phenomena. Under particular conditions, people have been shown to infer their attitudes, emotions, and motives, in the same manner described by the theory.

Similar to introspection, but with an important difference: with introspection we directly examine our attitudes, feelings and motives. With self-perception processes we indirectly infer our attitudes, feelings, and motives by analyzing our behavior.

==== Causal attributions ====
Causal attributions are an important source of self-knowledge, especially when people make attributions for positive and negative events. The key elements in self-perception theory are explanations people give for their actions, these explanations are known as causal attributions.

Causal attributions provide answers to "Why?" questions by attributing a person's behavior (including our own) to a cause.

People also gain self-knowledge by making attributions for other people's behavior; for example "If nobody wants to spend time with me it must be because I'm boring".

== Activation ==
Individuals think of themselves in many different ways, yet only some of these ideas are active at any one given time. The idea that is specifically active at a given time is known as the Current Self-Representation. Other theorists have referred to the same thing in several different ways:

- The phenomenal self
- Spontaneous self-concept
- Self-identifications
- Aspects of the working self-concept

The current self-representation influences information processing, emotion, and behavior and is influenced by both personal and situational factors.

=== Personal factors that influence current self-representation ===
==== Self-concept ====
Self-concept, or how people usually think of themselves is the most important personal factor that influences current self-representation. This is especially true for attributes that are important and self-defining.

Self-concept is also known as the self-schema, made of innumerable smaller self-schemas that are "chronically accessible".

==== Self-esteem ====
Self-esteem affects the way people feel about themselves. People with high self-esteem are more likely to be thinking of themselves in positive terms at a given time than people suffering low self-esteem.

==== Mood state ====
Mood state influences the accessibility of positive and negative self-views.

When we are happy we tend to think more about our positive qualities and attributes, whereas when we are sad our negative qualities and attributes become more accessible.

This link is particularly strong for people suffering low self-esteem.

==== Goals ====
People can deliberately activate particular self-views. We select appropriate images of ourselves depending on what role we wish to play in a given situation.

One particular goal that influences activation of self-views is the desire to feel good.

=== Situational factors that influence current self-representation ===
==== Social roles ====
How a person thinks of themselves depends largely on the social role they are playing. Social roles influence our personal identities.

==== Social context and self-description ====
People tend to think of themselves in ways that distinguish them from their social surroundings.

- The more distinctive the attribute, the more likely it will be used to describe oneself.

Distinctiveness also influences the salience of group identities.

Self-categorization theory proposes that whether people are thinking about themselves in terms of either their social groups or various personal identities depends partly on the social context.

- Group identities are more salient in the intergroup contexts.

===== Group size =====
The size of the group affects the salience of group-identities. Minority groups are more distinctive, so group identity should be more salient among minority group members than majority group members.

===== Group status =====
Group status interacts with group size to affect the salience of social identities.

==== Social context and self-evaluation ====
The social environment has an influence on the way people evaluate themselves as a result of social-comparison processes. The construction of self-image is the result of social interaction. The symbolic representations that underpin the collective imagination build stereotypes and prejudices, decisively affecting the way each person sees themselves and others.

===== The contrast effect =====
People regard themselves as at the opposite end of the spectrum of a given trait to the people in their company. However, this effect has come under criticism as to whether it is a primary effect, as it seems to share space with the assimilation effect, which states that people evaluate themselves more positively when they are in the company of others who are exemplary on some dimension.

- Whether the assimilation or contrast effect prevails depends on the psychological closeness, with people feeling psychologically disconnected with their social surroundings being more likely to show contrast effects. Assimilation effects occur when the subject feels psychologically connected to their social surroundings.

==== Significant Others and Self-Evaluations ====
Imagining how one sees others influences how one thinks about oneself, so analyzing oneself from another's perspective creates a new image of oneself.

==== Recent events ====
Recent events can cue particular views of the self, either as a direct result of failure, or via mood.The extent of the effect depends on personal variables. For example people with high self-esteem do not show this effect, and sometimes do the opposite.

Memory for prior events influence how people think about themselves.

Fazio et al. found that selective memory for prior events can temporarily activate self-representations which, once activated, guide our behavior.

== Deficiencies ==
=== Specific types ===
==== Misperceiving ====
- Deficiency in knowledge of the present self.
- Giving reasons but not feelings disrupts self-insight.

==== Misremembering ====
- Deficiency of knowledge of the past self.
- Knowledge from the present overinforms the knowledge of the past.
- False theories shape autobiographical memory.

==== Misprediction ====
- Deficiency of knowledge of the future self.
- Knowledge of the present overinforms predictions of future knowledge.
- Affective forecasting can be affected by durability bias.

== See also ==
- Affective forecasting
- Cognitive dissonance
- Know thyself
- Memory
- Phenomenology
- Self-awareness
- Self-categorization theory
- Self-concept
- Self-enhancement
- Self-esteem
- Self-perception theory
- Self psychology
- Self-verification theory
- Social comparison theory
- Social identity
- Agency
- Sociology
