= Self-concept =

One's internal beliefs about oneself

In the psychology of self, one's self-concept (also called self-construction, self-identity, self-perspective or self-structure) is a collection of beliefs about oneself. Generally, self-concept embodies the answer to the question "Who am I?".

The self-concept is distinguishable from self-awareness, which is the extent to which self-knowledge is defined, consistent, and currently applicable to one's attitudes and dispositions. Self-concept also differs from self-esteem: self-concept is a cognitive or descriptive component of one's self (e.g., "I am a fast runner"), while self-esteem is evaluative and opinionated (e.g., "I feel good about being a fast runner").

Self-concept is made up of one's self-schemas, and interacts with self-esteem, self-knowledge, and the social self to form the self as a whole. It includes the past, present, and future selves, where future selves (or possible selves) represent individuals' ideas of what they might become, what they would like to become, or what they are afraid of becoming. Possible selves may function as incentives for certain behaviour.

The perception people have about their past or future selves relates to their perception of their current selves. The temporal self-appraisal theory argues that people have a tendency to maintain a positive self-evaluation by distancing themselves from their negative self and paying more attention to their positive one. In addition, people have a tendency to perceive the past self less favourably (e.g., "I'm better than I used to be") and the future self more positively (e.g., "I will be better than I am now").

== History ==
Psychologists Carl Rogers and Abraham Maslow had major influence in popularizing the idea of self-concept in the West. According to Rogers, everyone strives to reach an "ideal self." He believed that a person gets to self-actualize when they prove to themselves that they are capable enough to achieve their goals and desires, but in order to attain their fullest potential, the person must have been raised in healthy surroundings which consist of "genuineness, acceptance, and empathy"; however, the lack of relationships with people that have healthy personalities will stop the person from growing "like a tree without sunlight and water" and affect the individual's process to accomplish self- actualization. Rogers also hypothesized that psychologically healthy people actively move away from roles created by others' expectations, and instead look within themselves for validation. On the other hand, neurotic people have "self-concepts that do not match their experiences. They are afraid to accept their own experiences as valid, so they distort them, either to protect themselves or to win approval from others."

According to Carl Rogers, the self-concept has three different components:

- The view one has of oneself (self-image)
- How much value one places on oneself (self-esteem or self-worth)
- What one wishes one were really like (ideal self)

Abraham Maslow applied his concept of self-actualization in his hierarchy of needs theory. In this theory, he explained the process it takes for a person to achieve self-actualization. He argues that for an individual to get to the "higher level growth needs", he must first accomplish "lower deficit needs". Once the "deficiency needs" have been achieved, the person's goal is to accomplish the next step, which is the "being needs". Maslow noticed that once individuals reach this level, they tend to "grow as a person" and reach self-actualization; however, individuals who experienced negative events while being in the lower deficit needs level prevents them from ascending in the hierarchy of needs.

The self-categorization theory developed by John Turner states that the self-concept consists of at least two "levels": a personal identity and a social one. In other words, one's self-evaluation relies on self-perceptions and how others perceive them. Self-concept can alternate rapidly between one's personal and social identity. Children and adolescents begin integrating social identity into their own self-concept in elementary school by assessing their position among peers. By age five, acceptance from peers significantly affects children's self-concept, affecting their behaviour and academic success.

== Model ==
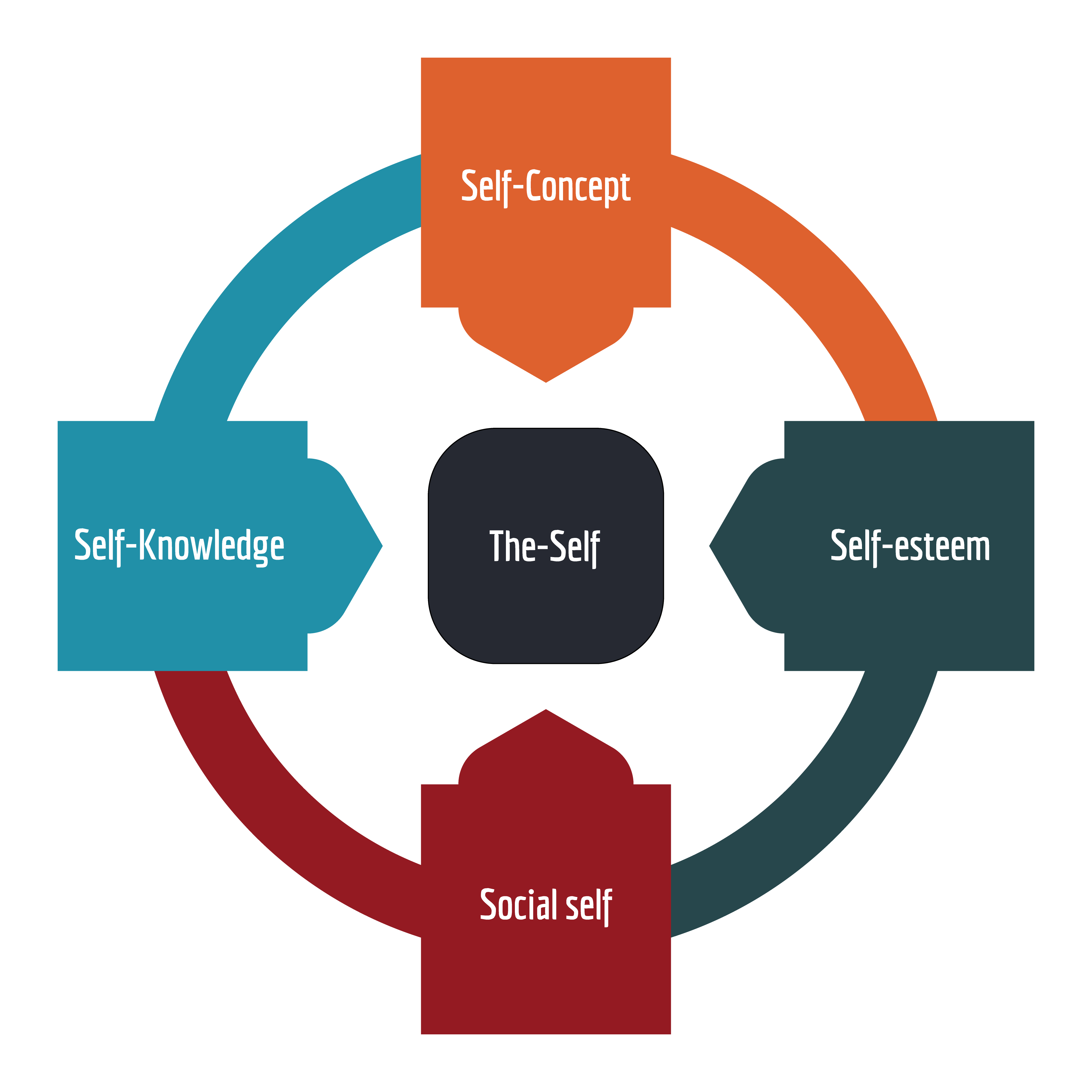
One's self-perception is defined by one's self-concept, self-knowledge, self-esteem, and social self.

The self-concept is an internal model that uses self-assessments in order to define one's self-schemas. Changes in self-concept can be measured by spontaneous self-report, where a person is prompted by a question like "Who are you?". Often when measuring changes to the self-evaluation, whether a person has a positive or negative opinion of oneself, is measured instead of self-concept.

Features such as personality, skills and abilities, occupation and hobbies, physical characteristics, gender, etc., are assessed and applied to self-schemas, which are ideas of oneself in a particular dimension (e.g., someone that considers themselves a geek will associate "geek-like" qualities to themselves). A collection of self-schemas makes up one's overall self-concept. For example, the statement "I am lazy" is a self-assessment that contributes to self-concept. Statements such as "I am tired", however, would not be part of someone's self-concept, since being tired is a temporary state and therefore cannot become a part of a self-schema. A person's self-concept may change with time as reassessment occurs, which in extreme cases can lead to identity crises.

=== Parts ===
Various theories identify different parts of the self including:

- Self-image: the view one has of oneself
- Self-esteem: how much you value yourself
- Ideal self: what you wish to be
- Social identity: the part of the self that is determined by members in social groups

== Development ==
Researchers debate over when self-concept development begins. Some assert that gender stereotypes and expectations set by parents for their children affect children's understanding of themselves by approximately age three. However, at this developmental stage, children have a very broad sense of self; typically, they use words such as big or nice to describe themselves to others. While this represents the beginnings of self-concept, others suggest that self-concept develops later, in middle childhood, alongside the development of self-control. At this point, children are developmentally prepared to interpret their own feelings and abilities, as well as receive and consider feedback from peers, teachers, and family. In adolescence, the self-concept undergoes a significant time of change. Generally, self-concept changes more gradually, and instead, existing concepts are refined and solidified. However, the development of self-concept during adolescence shows a U-shaped curve, in which general self-concept decreases in early adolescence, followed by an increase in later adolescence.

Romantic relationships can affect people's self-concept throughout a relationship. Self-expansion describes the addition of information to an individual's concept of self. Self-expansion can occur during relationships. Expansion of self-concept can occur during relationships, during new challenging experiences.

Additionally, teens begin to evaluate their abilities on a continuum, as opposed to the "yes/no" evaluation of children. For example, while children might evaluate themselves "smart", teens might evaluate themselves as "not the smartest, but smarter than average." Despite differing opinions about the onset of self-concept development, researchers agree on the importance of one's self-concept, which influences people's behaviors and cognitive and emotional outcomes including (but not limited to) academic achievement, levels of happiness, anxiety, social integration, self-esteem, and life-satisfaction.

=== Academic ===
Academic self-concept refers to the personal beliefs about their academic abilities or skills. Some research suggests that it begins developing from ages three to five due to influence from parents and early educators. By age ten or eleven, children assess their academic abilities by comparing themselves to their peers. These social comparisons are also referred to as self-estimates. Self-estimates of cognitive ability are most accurate when evaluating subjects that deal with numbers, such as math. Self-estimates were more likely to be poor in other areas, such as reasoning speed.

Some researchers suggest that to raise academic self-concept, parents and teachers need to provide children with specific feedback that focuses on their particular skills or abilities. Others also state that learning opportunities should be conducted in groups (both mixed-ability and like-ability) that downplay social comparison, as too much of either type of grouping can have adverse effects on children's academic self-concept and the way they view themselves in relation to their peers.

=== Physical ===
Physical self-concept is the individual's perception of themselves in areas of physical ability and appearance. Physical ability includes concepts such as physical strength and endurance, while appearance refers to attractiveness and body image. Adolescents experience significant changes in general physical self-concept at the onset of puberty, about eleven years old for girls and about 15 years old for boys. The body changes during puberty, in conjunction with the various psychological changes of this period, makes adolescence especially significant for the development of physical self-concept. An important factor of physical self-concept development is participation in physical activities. It has even been suggested that adolescent involvement in competitive sports increases physical self-concept.

=== Gender identity ===
A person's gender identity is a sense of one's own gender. These ideas typically form in young children. According to the International Encyclopedia of Marriage and Family, gender identity is developed at an early age when the child starts to communicate; by the age of eighteen months to two years is when the child begins to identify as a girl or a boy. After this stage, some consider gender identity already formed, although some consider non-gendered identities more salient during that young of an age. Kohlberg noted gender constancy occurs by the ages of five to six, a child becomes well-aware of their gender identity. Both biological and social factors may influence identities such as a sense of individuality, identities of place as well as gendered identities. As part of environmental attitudes, some suggest women more than men care about the environment. Forms of gender stereotyping is also important to consider in clinical settings. For example, a study at Kuwait University with a small sample of 102 individuals with gender dysphoria examined self-concept, masculinity and femininity. Findings were that children who grew up on lower family bonds had lower self-concept. Clearly, it is important to consider the context of social and political attitudes and beliefs before drawing any conclusions about gender identities in relation to personality, particularly about mental health and issues around acceptable behaviours.

=== Sexual identity ===
Sexual identity refers to one's self-perception in terms of romantic or sexual attraction towards others, though not mutually exclusive, and can be different from romantic identity. Sexual identity may also refer to sexual orientation identity, which is when people identify or dis-identify with a sexual orientation or choose not to identify with a sexual orientation. Sexual identity and sexual behavior are closely related to sexual orientation, but they are distinguished, with identity referring to an individual's conception of themselves, behavior referring to actual sexual acts performed by the individual, and sexual orientation referring to romantic or sexual attractions toward persons of the opposite sex or gender, the same sex or gender, to both sexes or more than one gender, or to no one.

== Measures ==
Since self-concept concerns one's awareness and perception of the external judgment from their social environment and the internal attributes of the self, self-reported questionnaires have been the most widely adopted measure for assessing self-concept. Many of the existing questionnaires in the academia do not differentiate between the assessment of self-concept and self-esteem. The most commonly used questionnaires include the Rosenberg Self-Esteem Scale, the Coopersmith Self-Esteem Inventory for Adults, the Adolescent Coping Scale (ACS) by Frydenberg and Lewis, as well as the Harter's Self-Perception Profile for Adolescents.

=== The Rosenberg Self-Esteem Scale (RSES) ===
The Rosenberg Self-Esteem Scale is a two-dimensional scale developed in 1965 by Morris Rosenberg, originally designed for measuring the self-esteem of adolescents, but has gained wider use in other populations, such as adults. This inventory comprises ten Likert scale items that assess one's level of self-confidence (or personal satisfaction) and self-contempt (or personal devaluation). With each item scaling from 1 to 4 points, a total of 30 points or above indicates a positive self-esteem/self-concept, 26-29 points indicating an intermediate self-esteem/self-concept, and those who get 25 points or below will be considered as having low self-esteem/self-concept.

=== The Coopersmith Self-Esteem Inventory (CSEI) ===
The Coopersmith Self-Esteem Inventory is a self-report questionnaire developed in 1981 to measure attitudes toward the self among children, adolescents and adults. The inventory comes in three forms: School Form (ages 8–15 years), Adult Form (ages 16 and above) and Short Form. Originally, the inventory was aimed at children in school (8–15 years) but later on, a revised version where 17 of the 58 items were rephrased to use with adults. The most commonly used version is the Adult Form. The inventory comprises 50 items and yields a total score alongside four separate scores which represent more specific aspects of self-esteem. These aspects include: general self, social self-peers, home parents and school academic. With each item scored using a dichotomous scale, scores rage from 0 to 50, with higher scores reflecting higher self-esteem.

=== The Adolescent Coping Scale (ACS) ===
The Adolescent Coping Scale (ACS) is an 80-item questionnaire developed in 1997 by Erica Frydenberg and Ramon Lewis. The aim of the questionnaire is to measure adolescent coping strategies on a 5-point Likert scale. The ACS uses a self-report approach to subcategorize 79 items into 18 common coping mechanisms, which are then grouped into three broad coping styles: coping in relation to others, productive coping, and non-productive coping. Examples of coping in relation to others include seeking professional help, social action, and social and spiritual support. Productive coping behaviours include focusing on the positive, finding solutions to the problem, and physical recreation, while non-productive mechanisms involve worrying, self blame, and wishful thinking. The final item, question 80, is an open-ended question that qualitatively assesses other mechanisms adolescents use to cope during difficult circumstances. The Adolescent Coping Scale gives respondents insight into their self-concept by giving them an opportunity to engage in self-assessment and reflect on their behaviours and how they respond to a given situation.

=== Harter's Self Perception Profile for Adolescents ===
The Self Perception Profile for Adolescents was developed by Susan Harter in 1988, consisting of nine sub-scales that each have five items. The measure assesses adolescents' perception of the self from nine aspects of their life, as listed below: physical appearance, romantic appeal, close friendship, social competence, behavioural conduct, scholastic competence, job competence, athletic competence, global self-worth. During the administration of the test, adolescents will choose one sub-scale and indicate their perceived competence in the particular aspect. Each item in the sub-scale scores from 1 (low perceived competence) to 4 (high perceived competence).

== Motivational properties ==
Self-concept can have motivational properties. There are four types of motives in particular that are most related to self-concept:

- Self-assessment: desire to receive information about the self that is accurate
- Self-enhancement: desire to receive feedback that informs the self of positive or desirable characteristics
- Self-verification: desire to confirm what one already knows about the self
- Self-improvement: desire to learn things that will help to improve the self

Some of these motives may be more prominent depending on the situation. In Western societies, the most automatic is the self-enhancement motive, and may be dominant in some situations where motives contradict one another. For example, the self-enhancement motive may contradict and dominate the self-assessment motive if one seeks out inaccurate compliments rather than honest feedback. Additionally, self-concept can motivate behavior because people tend to act in ways that reaffirm their self-concept, which is consistent with the idea of the self-verification motive. In particular, if people perceive the self a certain way and receive feedback contrary to this perception, a tension is produced that motivates them to reestablish consistency between environmental feedback and self-concept. For example, if someone believes herself to be outgoing, but someone tells her she is shy, she may be motivated to avoid that person or the environment in which she met that person because it is inconsistent with her self-concept of being an outgoing person. Further, another major motivational property of self-concept comes from the desire to eliminate the discrepancy between one's current self-concept and his or her ideal possible self. This is parallel with the idea of the self-improvement motive. For example, if one's current self-concept is that she is a novice at piano playing, though she wants to become a concert pianist, this discrepancy will generate motivation to engage in behaviors (like practicing playing piano) that will bring her closer to her ideal possible self (being a concert pianist).

== Cultural differences ==
Worldviews about one's self in relation to others differ across and within cultures. Western cultures place particular importance on personal independence and on the expression of one's own attributes (i.e., the self is more important than the group). This is not to say those in an independent culture do not identify and support their society or culture; there is simply a different type of relationship. Non-Western cultures favor an interdependent view of the self: Interpersonal relationships are more important than one's individual accomplishments, and individuals experience a sense of oneness with the group. Such identity fusion can have positive and negative consequences. Identity fusion can give people the sense that their existence is meaningful provided the person feels included within the society (for example, in Japan, the definition of the word for self (jibun) roughly translates to "one's share of the shared life space"). Identity fusion can also harm one's self-concept because one's behaviors and thoughts must be able to change to continue to align with those of the overall group. Non-interdependent self-concepts can also differ between cultural traditions.

Additionally, one's social norms and cultural identities have a large effect on self-concept and mental well-being. When a person can clearly define their culture's norms and how those play a part in their life, that person is more likely to have a positive self-identity, leading to better self-concept and psychological welfare. One example of this is in regards to consistency. One of the social norms within a Western, independent culture is consistency, which allows each person to maintain their self-concept over time. The social norm in a non-Western, interdependent culture has a larger focus on one's ability to be flexible and to change as the group and environment change. If this social norm is not followed in either culture, this can lead to a disconnection with one's social identity, which affects personality, behavior, and overall self-concept. Buddhists emphasize the impermanence of any self-concept.

Anit Somech, an organizational psychologist and professor, conducted a small study in Israel which showed that the divide between independent and interdependent self-concepts exists within cultures as well. Researchers compared mid-level merchants in an urban community with those in a kibbutz (collective community). The managers from the urban community followed the independent culture. When asked to describe themselves, they primarily used descriptions of their own personal traits without comparison to others within their group. When the independent, urban managers gave interdependent-type responses, most were focused on work or school, due to these being the two biggest groups identified within an independent culture. The kibbutz managers followed the interdependent culture. They used hobbies and preferences to describe their traits, which is more frequently seen in interdependent cultures as these serve as a means of comparison with others in their society. There was also a large focus on residence, lending to the fact they share resources and living space with the others from the kibbutz. These types of differences were also seen in a study done with Swedish and Japanese adolescents. Typically, these would both be considered non-Western cultures, but the Swedish showed more independent traits, while the Japanese followed the expected interdependent traits.

Along with viewing one's identity as part of a group, another factor that coincides with self-concept is stereotype threat. Many working names have been used for this term: stigmatization, stigma pressure, stigma vulnerability and stereotype vulnerability. The terminology that was settled upon Claude Steele and Joshua Aronson to describe this "situational predicament was 'stereotype threat.' This term captures the idea of a situational predicament as a contingency of their [marginalized] group identity, a real threat of judgment or treatment in the person's environment that went beyond any limitations within." Steele and Aronson described the idea of stereotype threat in their study of how this socio‐psychological notion affected the intellectual performance of African Americans. Steele and Aronson tested a hypothesis by administering a diagnostic exam between two different groups: African American and White students. For one group a stereotype threat was introduced while the other served as a control. The findings were that academic performance of the African American students was significantly lower than their White counterparts when a stereotype threat was perceived after controlling for intellectual ability. Since the inception by Steele and Aronson of stereotype threat, other research has demonstrated the applicability of this idea to other groups.

When one's actions could negatively influence general assumptions of a stereotype, those actions are consciously emphasized. Instead of one's individual characteristics, one's categorization into a social group is what society views objectively – which could be perceived as a negative stereotype, thus creating a threat. "The notion that stereotypes held about a particular group may create psychologically threatening situations associated with fears of confirming judgment about one's group, and in turn, inhibit learning and performance."

The presence of stereotype threat perpetuates a "hidden curriculum" that further marginalized minority groups. "Hidden curriculum" refers to a covert expression of prejudice where one standard is accepted as the "set and right way to do things". More specifically, the "hidden curriculum" is an unintended transmission of social constructs that operates in the social environment of an educational setting or classroom. In the United States' educational system, this caters to dominant culture groups in American society."A primary source of stereotyping is often the teachers education program itself. It is in these programs that teachers learn that poor students and students of color should be expected to achieve less than their 'mainstream' counterparts." These child-deficit assumptions are built into the program that instructs teachers and leads to inadvertently testing all students on a "mainstream" standard that is not necessarily academic and that does not account for the social values and norms of non-"mainstream" students.

For example, the model of "teacher as the formal authority" is the orthodox teaching role that has been perpetuated for many years until the 21st-century teaching model landed on the scene. As part of the 5 main teaching styles proposed by Anthony Grasha, a cognitive and social psychologist until his death in 2003, the authoritarian style is described as believing that there are "correct, acceptable, and standard ways to do things".

== Gender issues ==
Some say, girls tend to prefer one-on-one (dyadic) interaction, forming tight, intimate bonds, while boys prefer group activities. One study in particular found that boys performed almost twice as well in groups than in pairs, whereas girls did not show such a difference. In early adolescence, the variations in physical self-concepts appear slightly stronger for boys than girls. This includes self-concepts about movement, body, appearance and other physical attributes. Yet during periods of physical change such as infancy, adolescence and ageing, it is particularly useful to compare these self-concepts with measured skills before drawing broad conclusions

Some studies suggest self-concept of social behaviours are substantially similar with specific variations for girls and boys. For instance, girls are more likely than boys to wait their turn to speak, agree with others, and acknowledge the contributions of others. It seems boys see themselves as building larger group relationships based on shared interests, threaten, boast, and call names. In mixed-sex pairs of children aged 33 months, girls were more likely to passively watch a boy play, and boys were more likely to be unresponsive to what the girls were saying. In some cultures, such stereotypical traits are sustained from childhood to adulthood suggesting a strong influence of expectations by other people in these cultures. The key impacts of social self-concepts on social behaviours and of social behaviours on social self-concepts is a vital area of ongoing research.

In contrast, research suggest overall similarities for gender groups in self-concepts about academic work. In general, any variations are systematically gender-based yet small in terms of effect sizes. Any variations suggest overall academic self-concept are slightly stronger for men than women in mathematics, science and technology and slightly stronger for women than men about language related skills. It is important to observe there is no link between self concepts and skills [i.e., correlations about r = 0.19 are rather weak if statistically significant with large samples]. Clearly, even small variations in perceived self-concepts tend to reflect gender stereotypes evident in some cultures . In recent years, more women have been entering into the STEM field, working in predominantly mathematics, technology and science related careers. Many factors play a role in variations in gender effects on self-concept to accumulate as attitudes to mathematics and science; in particular, the impact other people's expectations rather than role-models on our self-concepts .

== Media ==
A commonly-asked question is "why do people choose one form of media over another?" According to the Galileo Model, there are different forms of media spread throughout three-dimensional space. The closer one form of media is to another the more similar the source of media is to each other. The farther away from each form of media is in space, the least similar the source of media is. For example, mobile and cell phone are located closest in space where as newspaper and texting are farthest apart in space. The study further explained the relationship between self-concept and the use of different forms of media. The more hours per day an individual uses a form of media, the closer that form of media is to their self-concept.

Self-concept is related to the form of media most used. If one considers oneself tech savvy, then one will use mobile phones more often than one would use a newspaper. If one considers oneself old fashioned, then one will use a magazine more often than one would instant message.

In this day and age, social media is where people experience most of their communication. With developing a sense of self on a psychological level, feeling as part of a greater body such as social, emotional, political bodies can affect how one feels about themselves. If a person is included or excluded from a group, that can affect how they form their identities. Growing social media is a place for not only expressing an already formed identity, but to explore and experiment with developing identities. In the United Kingdom, a study about changing identities revealed that some people believe that partaking in online social media is the first time they have felt like themselves, and they have achieved their true identities. They also revealed that these online identities transferred to their offline identities.

A 2007 study was done on adolescents aged 12 to 18 to view the ways in which social media affects the formation of an identity. The study found that it affected the formation in three different ways: risk taking, communication of personal views, and perceptions of influences. In this particular study, risk taking behavior was engaging with strangers. When it came to communication about personal views, half of the participants reported that it was easier to express these opinions online, because they felt an enhanced ability to be creative and meaningful. When it came to other's opinions, one subject reported finding out more about themselves, like openness to experience, because of receiving differing opinions on things such as relationships.

== See also ==
- Egocentric presentism
- Ego death
- Future self
- Gender self-identification
- Ideal self
- Identity (social science)
- Identity disturbance
- Moral identity
- Open individualism
- Personal boundaries
- Personal identity
- Psyche (psychology)
- Self (psychology)
- Self-assessment
- Self-awareness
- Self-categorization theory
- Self-consciousness
- Self-control
- Self-efficacy
- Self-esteem
- Self-image
- Self-knowledge (psychology)
- Self-perception
- Self-reflection
- Self-schema
- Teletransportation paradox
- Theory of mind
- Vertiginous question
