= Self-management =

Self-management may refer to:

- Self-care, when one's health is under individual control, deliberate, and self-initiated
- Self-medication, which includes both normal use of over-the-counter drugs and also some types of drug abuse
- Self-managed economy, based on autonomous self-regulating economic units and a decentralised mechanism of resource allocation and decision-making
- Self-management (computer science), process by which computer systems shall manage their own operation without human intervention
- Workers' self-management, a form of organizational management based on self-directed work processes
  - Socialist self-management, a social and economic model formulated by the Communist Party of Yugoslavia
