= Self-schema =

Set of memories for a person

The self-schema refers to a long lasting and stable set of memories that summarize a person's beliefs, experiences and generalizations about the self, in specific behavioral domains. A person may have a self-schema based on any aspect of themselves as a person–including physical characteristics (body image), personality traits, and interests–as long as they consider that aspect of their self to be important to their own self-definition.

For example, someone may have a self-schema of extraversion if they both think of themselves as extraverted and believe that extraversion is central to who they are. A self-schema for extraversion may include general self-categorizations ("I am sociable."), beliefs about how they would act in certain situations ("At a party, I would talk to lots of people") and also memories of specific past events ("On my first day at university I made lots of new friends.").

== General ==
The term schematic refers to information that matches with a self-schema in a particular dimension. For instance, a man in a rock band at night would be schematic of his "rocker" schema. However, if he works as a salesperson during the day, he would have a "salesperson" schema during that period of time. Schemas vary according to cultural background and other environmental factors.

Once people have developed a schema about themselves, there is a strong tendency for that schema to be maintained by a bias in what they attend to, in what they remember, and in what they are prepared to accept as true about themselves. In other words, the self-schema becomes self-perpetuating. The self-schema is then stored in long-term memory, which both facilitates and biases the processing of personally relevant information. Individuals who form a self-schema of a person with good exercise habits will then in return exercise more frequently.

Self-schemas vary from person to person because each individual has very different social and cultural life experiences. A few examples of self-schemas are: exciting or dull; quiet or loud; healthy or sickly; athletic or nonathletic; lazy or active; and geek or jock. If a person has a schema for "geek or jock," for example, he might think of himself as a bit of a computer geek and would possess a lot of information about that trait. Because of this, he would probably interpret many situations based on relevance to his being a computer geek.

Another person with the "healthy or sickly" schema might consider themselves a very health conscious person. Their concern with being healthy would then affect everyday decisions such as what groceries they buy, what restaurants they frequent, or how often they exercise. Women who are schematic on appearance exhibited worse body image, lower self-esteem, and more negative mood than did those who are aschematic on appearance.

The term aschematic means not having a schema for a particular dimension. This usually occurs when people are not involved with or concerned about a certain attribute. For example, if a person plans on being a musician, a self-schema in aeronautics will not apply to him; he is aschematic on aeronautics.

=== Childhood creation ===
Early in life, we are exposed to the idea of the self from our parents and other figures. We begin to take on a very basic self-schema, which is mostly limited to a "good child" or "bad child" schema—that is, we see ourselves in unambiguously positive or negative terms. It is in childhood that we begin to offer explanations for our actions, which reasoning creates the more complicated concept of the self: a child will begin to believe that the self caused their behaviors, deciding on what motivations to offer as explanations of behavior.

== Multiple ==
Most people have multiple self-schemas, however this is not the same as multiple personalities in the pathological sense. Indeed, for the most part, multiple self-schemas are extremely useful to people in daily life. Subconsciously, they help people make rapid decisions and behave efficiently and appropriately in different situations and with different people. Multiple self-schemas guide what people attend to and how people interpret and use incoming information. They also activate specific cognitive, verbal, and behavioral action sequences – called scripts and action plans in cognitive psychology – that help people meet goals efficiently. Self-schemas vary not only by circumstances and who the person is interacting with, but also by mood. Researchers found that we have mood-congruent self-schemas that vary with our emotional state.

== Differences between cultures ==
Self-schemas vary based on cultural context. Cultural differences are often examined between individualistic cultures, such as North America, and collectivistic cultures, such as East Asia. Members of individualistic cultures are more likely to form independent self-schemas which emphasize autonomy, individuality, and other internal traits when interacting with others. Alternatively, members of collectivistic cultures are more likely to form interdependent self-schemas which emphasize relationships and social roles when interacting with others.

The self-schema of "independent or interdependent" also affects cognition and behavior. An individual from a collectivistic culture is likely to vary their self-concept more between contexts than an individual from an individualistic culture. When recounting an event, one with an independent self-schema is more likely to highlight personal achievements or attributes, whereas one with an interdependent self-schema is more likely to focus on others or the expectations of their social role.

== The body ==
The self's relationship with and understanding of the body is an important part of self-schema. Body schema is a general term that has multiple definitions in various disciplines. Generally, it refers to a person's concept of his or her own body, where it is in space, what it looks like, how it is functioning, etc.

Our body image is part of our self-schema. The body image includes the following:

- The perceptual experience of the body
- The conceptual experience of the body—what we have been told and believe about our body, including scientific information, hearsay, myth, etc.
- The emotional attitude towards the body

Our body schemata may transcend the realities of what our bodies actually are—or in other words, we may have a different mental picture of our bodies than what they physically are. This is evidenced when individuals who lose limbs have phantom limb sensations. Individuals who lose a limb may still feel like they have that limb. They may even feel in that limb sensations from other limbs.

An example of someone having a self schema or belief, is if someone has a contorted belief of what their body looks like which can lead to body dysmorphia. If they think of themselves as or have been told that they are "too fat," or "too skinny," they will believe that. They will also believe that this contorted version of themselves is actually them. People who possess this self schema might tell themselves negative things to make them feel bad about themselves.

== Effect of illness ==
Individuals afflicted with both physical and mental illness have more negative self-schemas. This has been documented in patients suffering from such illnesses as depression and irritable bowel syndrome. Sufferers tend to identify themselves with their illness, subconsciously associating the negative traits of the illness itself with themselves.

== See also ==
- Behavioural confirmation
- Identity (social science)
- List of maladaptive schemas
- Outline of self
- Self-image
- Self-perception theory
- Egosyntonicity
