= Psychology of self =

Study of the representation of one's identity

The psychology of self is the study either of the cognitive, conative or affective representation of one's identity, or of the subject of experience. The earliest form of the self in modern psychology saw the emergence of two elements, I and me, with I referring to the self as the subjective knower and me referring to the self as a subject that is known. Current views of the self in psychology position it as playing an integral part in human motivation, cognition, affect, and social identity. Over time, different theorists from multiple schools of thought in psychology have developed theories of the self. Meanwhile, pop psychology has adopted and exploited the concepts of "self" and finding or ackowledging one's "true self".

== In clinical psychology ==
=== Jungian's Self archetype ===
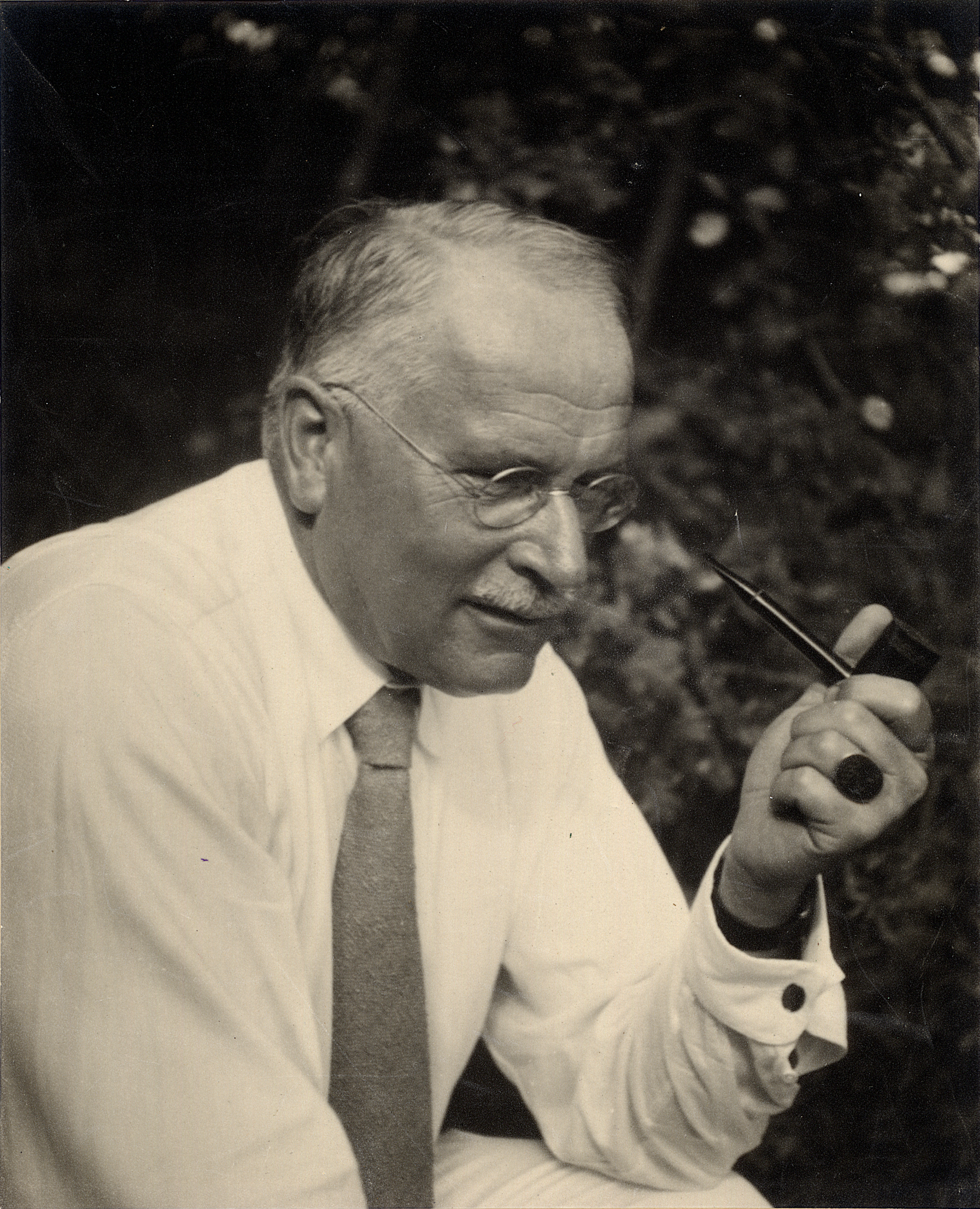
Carl Jung in 1935

In classical Jungian analysis, the Self (typically capitalized in Jungian literature) is the culmination of several archetypes, which are predispositions of how a person responds to the world. The Self signifies the coherent whole, unifying both the conscious and unconscious mind of a person. The Self, according to Jung, is the most important and difficult archetype to understand. It is fully realized as the product of individuation, which is defined by Jung as the rebirth of the ego back to the original self.

The Self, besides the center of the psyche, is also autonomous, meaning that it exists outside of time and space. Jung also called the Self an imago Dei. The Self is the source of dreams and often appears as an authority figure in dreams with the ability to perceive events not yet occurred or guide one in the present.

=== Kohut's formulation ===
Kohut followed Freud's line of thinking regarding the self. However, he deviates from Freud by theorizing that the self puts energy into the idea of narcissism (See Cathexis). The system is then broken over time into initially two systems of narcissistic perfection: 1) a system of ambitions (the grandiose self) and 2) a system of ideals (the idealized parent imago). According to Kohut, these two systems represent the poles within Kohut's bipolar self. These poles work with each other to maintain a balance that is referred to as the self

=== Winnicott's selves ===
Donald Winnicott distinguished what he called the "true self" from the "false self" in the human personality, considering the true self as one based on the individual's sense of being, not doing, something which was rooted in the experiencing body.

Nevertheless, Winnicott did not undervalue the role of the false self in the human personality, regarding it as a necessary form of defensive organization similar to that of a caretaker that protects the true self hides behind so that it may continue to exist.

Five levels of false self-organization were identified by Winnicott, running along a kind of continuum.

1. In the most severe instance, the false self completely replaces and ousts the true self, leaving the latter a mere possibility.
2. Less severely, the false self protects the true self, which remains unactualized.
3. Closer to health, the false self supports the individual's search for conditions that will allow the true self to recover its own identity.
4. Even closer to health, we find the false self "... established on the basis of identifications".
5. Finally, in a healthy person, the false self is composed of that which facilitates social behavior, the manners and courtesy that allows for a smooth social life, with emotions expressed in socially acceptable forms.

As for the true self, Winnicott linked it to playing "hide and seek"' designed to protect one's real self against exploitation, without entirely forfeiting the ability to relate to others.

=== Berne's transactional analysis ===
In his transactional analysis theory Eric Berne distinguished the personality's ego states – Parent, Adult and Child – from what he called 'the real self, the one that can move from one ego state to another'.

- The Parent ego consists of borrowed behaviors and feelings from previous caregivers. The parent ego can consist of either the Nurturing or Critical Parent. Both types of parents offer information to the child that can be either beneficial or detrimental to their development.
- The Adult ego is otherwise known as our data-processing center. This ego state is able to judge information based on facts, rather than emotions or preconceived beliefs.
- The Child ego is identified as the state that holds all of a person's memories, emotions, and feelings. People carry this ego state with them all the time and can reflect on it at any time. This state can also be divided into two segments: the Free (or Natural) child and the Adapted (and/or Rebellious) child.

Berne considered that "the feeling of 'Self' is a mobile one. It can reside in any of the three ego states at any given moment, and can jump from one to the other as occasion arises."

A person's tone, gestures, choice of words, posture, and emotional state can portray which ego state they are currently in. By knowing about their own ego states, a person can use each one in particular situations in order to enhance their experience or make new social connections.

Berne saw the self as the most valuable part of the personality: "when people get to know each other well, they penetrate into the depths where this real Self resides, and that is the part of the other person they respect and love".

== In social psychology ==
Social psychology acknowledges that "one of the most important life tasks each a person faces is understanding who they are and how they feel about themselves". This allows us to better understand ourselves, abilities, and preferences so that a person can make choices and decisions that suit them the best. However, rather than absolute knowledge, it would seem that "a healthy sense of self calls for both accurate self-knowledge and protective self-enhancement, in just the right amounts at just the right times."

Other schools of thought look at the self from a social psychology perspective. Some are listed below.

The self is an automatic part of every human being that enables them to relate to others. The self is made up of three main parts that allow for the self to maintain its function: self-knowledge, the interpersonal self, and the agent self.

=== Self-knowledge ===
Self-knowledge is something many seek to understand. In knowing about their selves, a person is more capable of knowing how to be socially acceptable and desirable. They seek out self-knowledge due to the appraisal motive, self-enhancement motive, and consistency motive.

Self-knowledge is sometimes referred to as self-concept. This feature allows for people to gather information and beliefs about themselves. A person's self-awareness, self-esteem, and self-deception all fall under the self-knowledge part of self. People learn about themselves through our looking-glass selves, introspection, social comparisons, and self-perception.

- The looking glass self is a term used to describe a theory that people learn about themselves through other people. In the looking-glass self-proposal, a person visualizes how they appear to others, how they are judged by others, and how they respond to said judgements. the person imagines how other people will judge them, and they then develop a response to the judgment they receive from other people.
- Introspection is the way a person gathers information about oneself through mental functions and emotions. While a person might not know why they are thinking or feeling a certain way, they consciously know what they are feeling.
- Social comparison is the way in which people compare themselves to others. By observing others, a person can gauge their work and behaviors as good, bad, or neutral. This can be either motivational or discouraging to the person depending on who they are comparing themselves to
- The self-perception theory is another theory in which a person makes inferences about themselves through their own actions and attitudes.
- Self-awareness occurs when someone acknowledges their own personality and behaviors. This can occur in both the private and public parts of a person's life.
- Self-esteem describes how a person evaluates their self. Four factors that contribute to self-esteem are; reactions from others, comparing a person to others, a person's social roles, and a person's identification.

=== Interpersonal self ===
The Interpersonal self, also known as the public self, refers to the part of the self that can be seen by other members of society. Because society has "unwritten rules", a person may find themselves in a specific role that adheres to these rules and expected behaviors…

=== Agent self (non self) ===
The agent self is known as the executive function that allows for actions. This is how a person makes choices and maintains control in situations and actions. The agent self resides over everything that involves decision making, self-control, taking charge in situations, and actively responding.

=== George-Mead & Charles Clooney ===
Symbolic interactionism stresses the 'social construction of an individual's sense of self' through two main methods: 'In part the self emerges through interaction with others....But the self is a product of social structure as well as of face-to-face interaction'. This aspect of social psychology emphasizes the theme of mutual constitution of the person and situation. Instead of focusing on the levels of class, race, and gender structure, this perspective seeks to understand the self in the way an individual lives their life on a moment-by-moment basis.

=== Self as an emergent phenomenon ===
In dynamical social psychology as proposed by Nowak et al., the self is rather an emergent property that emerges as an experiential phenomenon from the interaction of psychological perceptions and experiences. This is also hinted in dynamical evolutionary social psychology where a set of decision rules generates complex behavior.

== Memory and the self ==
=== Martin A. Conway ===
Memory and the self are interconnected to the point that they can be defined as the self-memory system (SMS). The self is viewed as a combination of memories and self-images (working self). Martin A. Conway proposes that a person's long-term memory and working self are dependent on each other. Our prior knowledge of our self puts constraints on what our working self is and the working self modifies the access to our long-term memory and what it consists of.

=== John Locke ===
One view of the self that follows the thinking of John Locke, sees it as a product of episodic memory. It has been suggested that transitory mental constructions within episodic memory form a self-memory system that grounds the goals of the working self, but research upon those with amnesia find they have a coherent sense of self based upon preserved conceptual autobiographical knowledge, and semantic facts, and so conceptual knowledge rather than episodic memory.

Both episodic and semantic memory systems have been proposed to generate a sense of self-identity: personal episodic memory enables the phenomenological continuity of identity, while personal semantic memory generates the narrative continuity of identity. "The nature of personal narratives depends on highly conceptual and 'story-like' information about one's life, which resides at the general event level of autobiographical memory and is thus unlikely to rely on more event-specific episodic systems."

== See also ==
- Dialogical self
- Future self
- 'I' and the 'me'
- Identity (social science)
- Open individualism
- Outline of self
- Personality psychology
- Philosophy of self
- Self-concept
- Self-discovery
- Self-discrepancy theory
- Self-efficacy
- Self-schema
- True Will
- Vertiginous question
