= Incentive =

Something that motivates individuals to perform

An incentive is anything that persuades a person or organization to alter their behavior to produce a desired outcome. Incentives are widely studied in personnel economics, where researchers and human resource managers examine how firms use pay, career opportunities, performance evaluation, and other mechanisms to motivate employees and improve organizational outcomes. Higher incentives are often associated with greater levels of effort and higher levels of performance. In comparison, disincentives discourage certain actions.

Incentives encourage specific behaviors or actions by persons and organizations, and are commonly employed by governments, businesses, and other organizations. Incentives may generally be divided into two categories: intrinsic and extrinsic. Incentives, however, can also produce unintended outcomes, relating to the overjustification effect, principal–agent problem, moral hazard, free-riding, or adverse selection.

== Classification ==
Incentives encourage specific behaviors or actions by persons and organizations, and are commonly employed by governments, businesses, and other organizations. Incentives may generally divided into two categories: intrinsic and extrinsic.

=== Theories ===
Political scientists Peter B Clark and James Q Wilson categorise incentives into three types: material, solidary, and purposive.

Author David Callahan identifies three broad classes of incentives. Remunerative or financial incentives, involve material rewards. Moral incentives involve action being regarded as the right or admirable choice; individuals acting on moral incentives may experience self-esteem, praise, or admiration from others, while failing to act accordingly can result in guilt, condemnation, or even ostracism. Coercive incentives threaten, when failure to act in a specified way occurs, the use of physical or coercive force by others.

=== Intrinsic and extrinsic incentives ===
An intrinsic incentive arises when an individual is motivated by personal satisfaction, interest, or enjoyment in an activity, without seeking external rewards or responding to external pressure. Extrinsic incentives involve external rewards or pressures, such as monetary compensation, recognition, or the threat of punishment.

Both intrinsic and extrinsic incentives influence behavior, though research suggests intrinsic motivation may have stronger and more sustainable effects by increasing genuine enjoyment and engagement. Intrinsic incentives are often associated with greater autonomy, commitment, and work involvement. At the same time, excessive reliance on external rewards can diminish intrinsic motivation, a phenomenon known as the overjustification effect, and crowd out intrinsic incentives.

==== Monetary incentives ====
Monetary incentives are financial rewards given to influence behavior and align an individual's actions with those of the provider of the incentive. They are a type of extrinsic incentive and are common in workplaces. The effects of monetary incentives are often described as a "standard direct price effect" and an "indirect psychological effect." These two effects can act in opposite directions, sometimes reducing the very behavior the incentives are designed to encourage. Some research suggests that these crowding-out effects can be managed using models that account for nonstandard behavioral assumptions. A 2026 meta-analysis of 2,193 estimates from 88 economics experiments found that, after correction for publication bias, the mean effect of financial incentives on performance is close to zero in most field settings, with modest positive effects in laboratory experiments and when incentives are framed as losses.

Examples of monetary incentives include profit sharing, bonuses, stock options, and paid vacation time. When structured effectively, they can positively influence motivation, productivity, and output at both individual and organizational levels. Performance-based pay, such as commission-based compensation, ties rewards to productivity or output over a defined period. Firms may also pay overtime wages or provide rewards for work beyond expectations. Expectancy theory holds that if employees believe that greater effort will lead to better performance and value the associated reward, monetary incentives can help sustain high levels of effort and reduce shirking, thereby increasing both individual and overall productivity.

The effectiveness of monetary incentives depends on job type and task characteristics. In routine jobs, such as clerical or administrative work, they can help sustain consistent effort once intrinsic motivation declines. For difficult tasks, however, monetary incentives may have little effect on increasing performance. For example, in creative workplace tasks, a field experiment on employee suggestions found that rewards for approved ideas increased idea quality but did not increase the net number of submitted ideas. The framing of rewards can also affect their impact. For instance, in cadaveric organ donation, funeral aid is perceived as more ethical and socially acceptable than direct cash payments of equal value, and may increase willingness to donate. Firms may also use negative incentives, such as the threat of demotion or termination for poor performance, which can motivate employees when they perceive their careers to be at risk.

==== Executive compensation ====
Boards of directors use incentives to align CEO behavior with shareholder interests. CEOs may receive salaries, bonuses, shares, or stock options to reward performance, while dismissal or reputational loss serve as penalties for poor performance. Ownership of company stock provides additional motivation by tying CEO wealth to shareholder value. Non-monetary incentives such as prestige, recognition, or authority may also influence performance, though their impact is debated.

=== Non-monetary incentives ===
Non-monetary incentives are rewards not directly tied to financial compensation but used to motivate individuals to perform specific actions or achieve desired outcomes. They are based on the recognition that individuals are motivated by a range of factors beyond money, and can reinforce engagement and productivity.

Examples include additional holidays, recognition, praise, opportunities for growth, gifts, family benefits, or more engaging work assignments. These incentives often enhance job satisfaction, reduce turnover, and are perceived as more memorable than financial incentives by standing apart from normal pay. They have also been found to promote long-term commitment, loyalty, and positive perceptions of an organization. Some research suggests that non-monetary incentives produce stronger and longer-lasting effects on motivation and productivity than financial rewards.

Non-monetary incentives may be less effective for individuals primarily motivated by financial rewards, such as those in low-paying jobs or under financial stress. They can also be more difficult to quantify and evaluate than monetary incentives, which makes designing effective programs challenging.

== Microeconomics ==
In economics, incentives are analyzed through the systems that determine how agents can be motivated to achieve outcomes desired by a principal. Firms use incentives to link rewards to productivity, aiming to reducing turnover by retaining productive employees, and improving overall output by encouraging greater effort and engagement. Increasing pay variance within firms globally reflects the rising demand for high productivity, leading to a shift toward pay-for-performance models. These schemes reinforce the link between work and reward.

Incentives, however, can also produce unintended outcomes. Poorly designed systems may encourage "gaming" behavior, where individuals maximize rewards without meeting actual objectives. This is central to the principal–agent problem, in which the goals of the principal (such as a government or company) diverge from those of the agent (such as employees). Misaligned incentives can lead to moral hazard—where agents take risks without bearing full costs—or to adverse selection, when asymmetric information causes inefficient or distorted outcomes.

=== Self-selection effects of incentives ===
Because employees know more about their own skills, competitiveness, and risk attitudes than employers do, firms also design incentives to recruit suitable workers. This is called the self-selection or sorting effect. For example, pay-for-performance schemes attract more productive, less risk-averse workers, while fixed wages appeal to more risk-averse individuals.

=== Misaligned incentives ===
A misaligned incentive arises when the goals of different parties conflict. This can occur within firms, but also in government, healthcare, education, and environmental policy. For example, principals in a firm want agents to act in the firm's best interests, but employees may pursue different objectives. Because of information asymmetry, principals often lack precise knowledge of how to motivate or evaluate agents. Compensation plans are therefore difficult to design. Principal–agent theory is often used to align incentives with employee effort in order to achieve efficient output.

In this relationship, agents usually have informational advantages over principals. Moral hazard arises when principals cannot be sure that agents are exerting full effort, while adverse selection occurs when principals cannot determine which agents are best suited for tasks. Agents may shirk, leak information, misreport, or conceal abilities in order to reduce their workload or benefit competitors.

=== Tournament theory ===
Tournament theory describes a framework of compensation based on an individual's position within a firm's hierarchy, such that compensation is a function of relative, rather than absolute, performance. Ceteris paribus, the larger the difference in compensation between one position to the next, the greater the incentive to exert more effort in order to achieve a promotion. Larger firms, with more competitors, may dilute the effect of increasing effort by way of competition. Relative pay schemes may, however, foster rivalry and reduce cooperation, forcing firms to balance pay variance with workplace harmony.

=== Team-based incentives ===
Due to constantly advancing technologies, individual employees seldom have an absolute advantage across all skills required within a firm. Many large firms organize production around teams to address complex, multidimensional tasks requiring diverse skills. In such settings, individual performance is difficult to measure, making team-based incentives preferable to individual piece rates. Team-based incentives reward collective performance, fostering cooperation, trust, and cohesion. Studies find positive effects on efficiency, stability, pay, and company output.

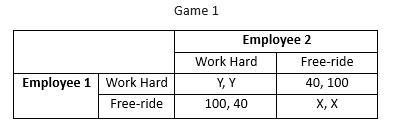
Payoffs of two employees assigned to a group project and faced with the choice of working hard or free riding.

Team-based incentives, however, may be seen as unfair if unequal contributions receive equal rewards.

Team-based incentives may also induce free-riding. This happens, for example, if employees have to share team output so that each employee only gets a fraction of what he or she generates. Managers may mitigate this through sufficiently strong incentives, penalties, or peer rating systems., or by relying on peer pressure or hiring intrinsically motivated employees. Free-riding also arises when team members' responsibility diffuses because members cannot be jointly held accountable. In this case, declaring a single person responsible may help.

=== Cultural differences ===
The effectiveness of pay-for-performance incentives varies across cultures. One study across six countries found that monetary incentives generally increased effort more than psychological nudges, but this effect was stronger in Western than non-Western cultures. Another study found that financial rewards improved test performance among US students, but not among students in China. These findings align with cross-cultural studies showing that pay-for-performance is more common in individualistic societies, such as the US and UK, than in collectivist ones.

=== Potential issues in firms ===
==== Ratchet effect ====
Incentives can sometimes reduce productivity through the ratchet effect. Firms may use an employee's initial output as a benchmark for future standards. Anticipating this, employees may withhold effort at the start or conceal their true capabilities, later increasing output strategically to gain rewards. This reduces efficiency in both firms and planned economies.

==== Crowding-out effect ====
Economists and psychologists have also studied the crowding-out effect, in which extrinsic incentives undermine intrinsic motivation. Richard Titmuss's 1970 book The Gift Relationship argued that monetary incentives disrupted social norms around voluntary contribution. Large incentives may temporarily offset this, but may also signal undesirable implications, reducing their effectiveness. Removing temporary incentives can also depress effort below baseline levels.

==== Stock options ====
Stock options were widely adopted in the 1990s to align CEO and shareholder interests, but often produced mixed outcomes. While successful decisions could raise long-term stock prices, some CEOs engaged in accounting manipulation to preserve incentive-based pay. Such schemes proved costly and were not always effective at ensuring alignment.

==== Pay variance conflicts ====
Pay inequality within firms can also lower morale. Low-paid employees may reduce effort, disengage, or find it harder to cooperate with higher-paid colleagues, lowering overall productivity. Bonus-based systems may also reduce motivation if rewards fluctuate with company profits rather than effort. Firms sometimes offset this by using non-monetary rewards, such as promotions or extra vacation time, to maintain fairness and engagement.

== Philanthropy and charity ==
When it comes to volunteering activities, monetary incentives can bring negative effects. According to the self-perception theory, humans constantly seek explanations for their behavior. When individuals are involved in volunteering activities, they most likely perceive themselves as prosocial and altruistic, and attach a symbolic price to the act of volunteering. When a monetary reward is attached to an otherwise prosocial activity such as volunteering, people may perceive that their originally altruistic actions are now linked to extrinsic incentives, causing their self-image benefit and prosocial motivation to decrease. A crowding-out effect leads to a decrease in individuals' desire to volunteer and people eventually stop contributing due to the rewards attached. For example, if monetary incentives are offered for voluntary blood donation, it will have a negative effect on the number of people donating blood.

== Education ==
Extrinsic incentives offered to unmotivated students can potentially have positive short-run effects. However, the use of extrinsic incentives in education raises issues of morality and corruption, and have the potential to crowd out intrinsic incentives. Empirical evidence also largely supports the success of monetary incentives in improving educational inputs such as attendance and enrolment, but not educational outputs such as academic achievement.

Studies have demonstrated that the impact of monetary incentives is dependent on previous academic performance and individual ability. Monetary incentives tend to improve the academic results of high-ability students but have an adverse effect on the performance of students with lower aptitude.

== See also ==
- Climate finance
- Climate Investment Funds
- Bounty (reward)
- Eco-investing
- Environmental Quality Incentives Program
- Externality
- Incentive-centered design
- Incentive payments
- Incentive program
- Incentive trust
- Incentivization
- Investment incentive
- Laffer Curve
- Long-term incentive plan
- Loyalty marketing
- Loyalty program
- Motivation
- Motivational salience
- Motivations of open source programmers
- Motivations for online participation
- Performance-related pay
- Perverse incentive
- Positive-incentive value
- Profit motive
- Research and Development Tax Incentive
- Reward system
- Social Impact Incentives
- Steering tax
- Tax incentive
- Travel incentive
- Wicked problem
