= H.O.P.E Beach Volleyball Charity =

Volleyball tournament

The H.O.P.E. Beach Volleyball Charity Tournament is a philanthropic volleyball tournament that aims at earning money and gaining awareness on behalf of various charitable organizations. The first tournament took place in the summer of 1989, in Ottawa Ontario at Britania Beach and moved to Mooney's Bay Beach a few years later and continues at Mooney's Bay Beach today. The tournament is completely nonprofit and is put together by unpaid volunteers. The program normally reaches out to smaller, local charitable organizations. The tournament is held in Canada, on Toronto Island and in Ottawa, Ontario. The acronym H.O.P.E. stands for "Helping Other People Everywhere". The tournaments take place annually during the summer months.

== General history ==
Since the first tournament in 1989, HOPE has raised more than $650,000 for local charities. Annually the tournament treats to up to six thousand people. The ages range from 18-to mid-40s. To apply for the tournament you must be at least eighteen years old. Teams must have six to ten players. Everyone is guaranteed to play six games, and must pay a three hundred dollar entrance fee. There are six divisions; Beginner, Recreational, Intermediate, Competitive, Corporate Challenge, and New Individuals. Different rules may apply for different divisions. All divisions are separated my amount of experience. The tournament is the largest in southern Ontario and it caters to 400-500 teams annually. The tournament brings people from all parts of Canada and the United States. The event also gets extensive media coverage which has helped it grow and spread its cause extensively throughout its history. Since it is a non-profit organization the charity receives most of its resources and funds solely through donations.

== Location ==
The tournament is located at Mooneys Beach in Ottawa, Ontario, Canada. The tournament brings people from all parts of Canada and the United States.

HOPE chose volleyball as its charity because it is the number one amateur sport in Canada. Statistics show that over 800,000 Canadians play volleyball regularly. Many classes choose to add volleyball to their curriculum due to the low cost.

== Donations and fundraising ==
To enter the tournament all teams must pay around three hundred dollars. Individual players are required a smaller fee. Individuals may also pledge to donate a set amount annually. All funds that are collected go straight towards the two chosen charities and are in no way used for profit. The tournament raises all of its funds through fees and donations. To emphasize donations the organization has created an incentive program that delivers prizes to the highest donating individuals. A large number of charities have received money from the tournament over its history.

== H.O.P.E Volleyball ==
In junction to the HOPE tournament, the annual summer fest has become a part of the annual HOPE tradition. The fest provides various activities for the players and their families free of cost. The event has live entertainment, vendors, and food. The event is highly publicized which helps to spread knowledge of the tournament as well.
