= Crowding out =

Crowding out can refer to:

- Crowding out (biology)
- Crowding out (economics), concerning government intervention
- Motivation crowding theory, in psychology and microeconomics
