= Disincentive =

Discouragement to do something

A disincentive is something that discourages an individual or an organization from behaving in a certain way. Disincentives may fall within the scope of economics, social issues or politics. For comparison, incentives encourage behaving in a desirable way.

== Economic ==
Economic disincentives are any factors that demotivate an individual from following a particular path. For example, if pay for a particular task is too low, that prospective employee may choose to avoid following that particular employment route. Similarly, if an individual has a particular medical issue and the employer is unable or unwilling to accommodate his or her impediment, that individual will choose to look elsewhere for work.

== Politics ==
The furtherance of disincentives is a tool used by politicians both in foreign policy and domestic policy. Disincentives in foreign policy are means and tactics used to deter an adversary from belligerence. In domestic policy, a disincentive is a tool that aims to deter an individual from breaking the law or otherwise reoffending.

== See also ==
- Cognitive evaluation theory
- Elasticity (economics)
- Motivation
- Price elasticity of supply
