= Overjustification effect =

Psychological phenomenon

The overjustification effect is a phenomenon in psychology in which providing expected external incentive, such as money or prizes, for an already intrinsically rewarding activity can reduce a person's intrinsic motivation to perform that activity. It is commonly understood in terms of the interaction between intrinsic and extrinsic motivation, where external rewards may undermine pre-existing intrinsic interest, a process often described as motivational "crowding out". The effect has been widely discussed in research by Edward Deci and Mark Lepper. Once rewards are no longer offered, individuals may show reduced interest in the activity, namely, cognitive re-evaluation, although the extent of this effect can vary depending on contexts.

== Theoretical mechanisms ==
Several theoretical frameworks have been used to explain the overjustification effect, particularly focusing on the distinction between intrinsic motivation (when a person does the activity in the absence of a reward contigency or control) and extrinsic motivation (the activity with a reward contigency or control).

=== Self-perception theory ===
According to self-perception theory, developed by psychologist Daryl Bem, a person infers their own internal states based on external conditions and constraints to some extent. Bem’s self-perception theory believes that when a salient external incentive is present, individuals may attribute their behaviour to that external cause rather than to intrinsic interest. This process of self-inference is particularly likely when external constraints are strong (such as the presence of a reward) or when internal cues are weak or ambiguous. As a result, the activity may be reinterpreted as being performed for the rewards rather than for its inherent enjoyment. Over time, this would lead a person to conclude that they are performing the behavior solely for the reward, which shifts the person's motivation from intrinsic to extrinsic.

A classic example comes from an experiment by Leon Festinger and James M. Carlsmith (1959), in which participants were asked to complete a boring task and then tell another fellow student that it was enjoyable. Afterwards, participants were asked how much they had enjoyed the task. Those who were paid only $1 evaluated the task as significantly more enjoyable than those who received $20. This is because individuals who receive low compensation ($1) are more likely to rule out financial incentive as a motivating factor in their thinking process, and instead infer that their behaviour reflected genuine interest. When the external reward is subsequently removed, individuals may be less likely to engage in the activity, providing a theoretical explanation for the overjustification effect.

=== Cognitive evaluation theory ===
Laboratory studies in the 1970s indicated that individuals under conditions with extrinsic rewards showed diminished intrinsic motivation. Deci and his colleagues developed the cognitive evaluation theory to explain the underlying causes. As a sub-theory of self-determination theory, cognitive evaluation theory proposes that intrinsic motivation is shaped by individuals’ perceived locus of causality (PLOC), referring to whether individuals feel free to follow their inner interests, as well as by individuals’ experience of autonomy and competence.

According to this framework, external rewards and other contextual factors can influence intrinsic motivation by shifting individuals’ PLOC. Intrinsic motivation may increase if rewards are interpreted as pertaining positive information about an individual’s competence and self-control. In contrast, if individuals perceive the results as indicative of external control, this decreases their feelings of self-control and competence, which in turn decreases intrinsic motivation. It underlies the overjustification effect, as rewards perceived as controllong would shift the locus of causality and reduce intrinsic motivation.

In general, this account is broadly consistent with Self-perception theory, which similarly emphasises the importance of external cues in changing individuals’ intrinsic motivation, although the Cognitive evaluation theory specifies more on the extent to which people feel like they originate their behaviour.

=== Self-determination theory ===
Self-determination theory (SDT) is a theory of human motivation that focuses on how individuals internalise, or take on, goals and values as their own. It further distinguishes between different forms of extrinsic motivation, ranging from external regulation to more autonomous forms such as identified and integrated regulation. This continuum highlights that the impact of rewards on intrinsic motivation depends on the extent to which behaviours are internalised and experienced as self-determined. The distinction answers why some rewards undermine intrinsic motivation while others do not.

SDT is also a broad theory that extends the predictions of Cognitive evaluation theory to a wider range of contexts, including work organisations.The theory differentiates between various types of motivational states, distinguishes the organisational conditions where extrinsic rewards are more effective than intrinsic rewards, examines individual differences in orientation toward intrinsic versus extrinsic motivation and discusses managerial behaviour that can enhance intrinsic motivation.

Findings from the Deci et al. (1989) study have supported Self-determination theory as an approach to work motivation by showing how managers can impact the work attitudes of their employees. For example, the study reported that managerial autonomy support which included provision of options, giving relevant information in a non-autonomous way, acknowledging subordinates' perspectives and cultivating self-initiation resulted in employees having more positive work-related attitudes such as higher level of job satisfaction and increased level of trust in corporate management. This perspective suggests that the overjustification effect is not universal, but depends on whether rewards are perceived as supporting or constraining basic psychological needs.

== Experimental evidence ==
The overjustification effect has been widely demonstrated in many settings. These empirical research demonstrates that the impact of external rewards on intrinsic motivation relies on how rewards are structured and interpreted.

In one of the earliest demonstrations of this effect, Edward Deci and his colleagues conducted a laboratory experiment in 1971 where subjects showing baseline interest in solving a puzzle were exposed to two different conditions. The control group were not paid on all three days while the experimental group were not paid on the first day, were paid on the second day and were not paid again on the third day. The subjects were given a break in the middle of each session and were being observed while doing whatever they wanted. The results showed that the experimental group spent significantly more time than the control group playing the puzzle during their break time on day 2 when they were paid but significantly less on day 3 when they were not paid. This was interpreted as evidence that the extrinsic monetary reward significantly reduced their intrinsic motivation to engage in the task.

Researchers at Southern Methodist University conducted an experiment on 188 female university students in which they measured the subjects' continued interest in a cognitive task (a word game) after their initial performance under different incentives. The subjects were divided into two groups. Members of the first group were told that they would be rewarded for competence. Above-average players would be paid more and below-average players would be paid less. Members of the second group were told that they would be rewarded only for completion. Their pay was scaled by the number of repetitions or the number of hours playing. Afterwards, half of the subjects in each group were told that they over-performed, and the other half were told that they under-performed, regardless of how well each subject actually did. Members of the first group generally showed greater interest in the game and continued playing for a longer time than the members of the second group. "Over-performers" continued playing longer than "under-performers" in the first group, but "under-performers" continued playing longer than "over-performers" in the second group. This study showed that, when rewards do not reflect competence, higher rewards lead to less intrinsic motivation. But when rewards do reflect competence, higher rewards lead to greater intrinsic motivation.

Richard Titmuss suggested that paying for blood donations might reduce the supply of blood donors. To test this, a field experiment with three treatments was conducted. In the first treatment, the donors did not receive compensation. In the second treatment, the donors received a small payment. In the third treatment, donors were given a choice between the payment and an equivalent-valued contribution to charity. None of the three treatments affected the number of male donors, but the second treatment almost halved the number of female donors. However, allowing the contribution to charity fully eliminated this effect.

Overall, these findings show that the overjustification effect is not uniform, and is consistent with the explanations in Cognitive evaluation theory and Self-determination theory.

== Moderating factors ==
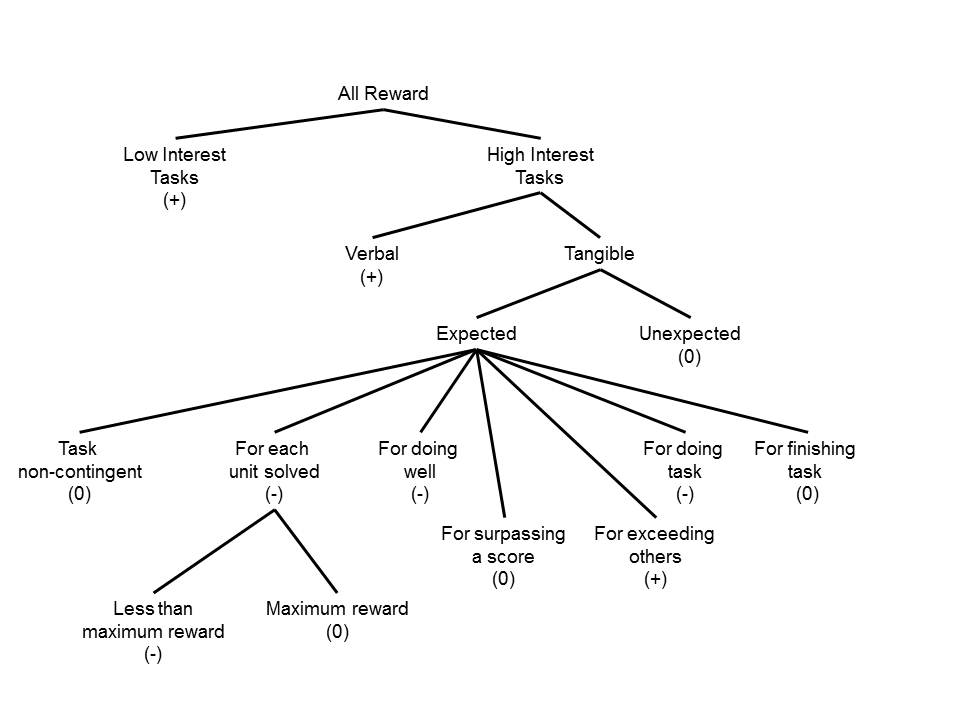
Directional effects of rewards on motivation, depending on type of task, type of reward, and contingency of reward.

There remains considerable ambiguity regarding the conditions under which the overjustification effect occurs and continue to be the subject of ongoing research. For instance, a commonly cited illustration shows a young man who initially enjoys reading, but may become to view it as ‘work’ if external rewards are introduced.

The major moderators are task characteristics, reward structures, and individual differences (e.g., age group).

=== 1. Initial intrinsic interest ===
Initial interest is an essential moderator in the motivation-undermining process. Researchers consistently found rewards reduced individuals’ motivation in high interest group in educational settings. Outside of the classrooms, a recent study indicates that in video game play situations, there is also a decrease in game-play willingness for participants with high initial interest.

In contrast, extensive evidence suggests that rewards may have the opposite effect when initial interest is low. A 2001 meta-analysis showed that rewards can increase intrinsic motivation for tasks that initially hold little intrinsic interest. Similarly, another separate meta-analysis found that tangible rewards offered for outperforming others and for performing uninteresting tasks (in which intrinsic motivation is low) lead to increased intrinsic motivation.

In either direction, these findings collectively suggest that initial interest plays a critical role in deciding whether external rewards undermine or enhance intrinsic motivation.

=== 2. Age group ===
There are also differences in effect among the different age groups. The negative effects extrinsic contingencies have on intrinsic motivation seem to be more severe for children than college students. One possible explanation is that college students have greater cognitive capacity, enabling them to better separate informational and controlling aspects of rewards. Hence they are able to interpret rewards as indicators of effective performance rather than controlling their behaviour, which causes them to operate with performance-goal orientations. Meanwhile, it has been suggested that older individuals may have more stable intrinsic interests, making them less susceptible to small rewards. It is therefore speculated that such differences are far greater between children and employed workers.

However, findings across studies are not entirely consistent. Feingold and Mahoney (1975) found that there is no reduction in intrinsic motivation among children following the introduction of token rewards in a play activity. Researchers argue that the underlying explanation may differ, as young children may not yet engage in advanced cognitive re-evaluation and reasoning processes about their behaviour. Therefore, the overjustification effect can occur in children, but its strength and underlying mechanisms may differ based on context and developmental stage.

=== 3. Reward contingency ===
Whether the subject understands the connection between the reward and the task is equally important in determining the overjustification effect’s strength. This perception changes ‘I do this task because I like it’ to ‘I do this task because I get rewards for doing it’. When an individual clearly connects rewards with completing the task (task-contingent reward), they are less likely to attribute their behaviour to genuine interest, which can reduce intrinsic motivation. On the flip, when rewards are unrelated to the task (task non-contingent), such as being given simply for participation, individuals are less likely to make this connection, and intrinsic motivation may remain unchanged.

Performance-contingent rewards make situations more complicated. When rewards are perceived as controlling, they may still reduce intrinsic motivation, according to the Cognitive Evaluation Theory. However, if such rewards also provide positive information about competence (e.g., through social comparison in games), they may maintain or even enhance intrinsic motivation. For example, verbal rewards such as positive feedback and praise are predicted to be experienced as controlling hence decreasing intrinsic motivation. However, verbal rewards that are informational and not experienced as controlling are predicted to exert positive effects. This helps explain the overjustification effect, as reward types matter. External rewards that are perceived as controlling can reduce individuals’ intrinsic motivation.

More broadly, considerable research has also shown that rewards do not always undermine intrinsic motivation because they can also enhance feelings of competence and autonomy. In highly competitive contexts like workplace, employees view earning incentives as enjoyable rather than a dreaded tool of management control. These findings are in contrast with the psychological mechanism for effects that Deci and his colleagues had claimed in the past. Also in the past 30 years, notable academic reviews of rewards have confirmed that monetary incentives have shown to significantly increase performance.

Additionally, some activities require a significant level of mastery or engagement before its attractiveness becomes apparent to an individual, in such cases external incentives may be useful to build individuals up to that level. Token economy programs represent one example in which there is evidence showing that such programs have successfully implemented extrinsic rewards to increase interest in certain broad classes of activities.

To summarise, beyond reward contingency, how rewards are interpreted by different individuals across different social contexts moderates the effect as well.

== Applications ==
=== Education ===
Findings from the Lepper, Greene & Nisbett 1973 study suggest that presenting these extrinsic rewards poses central problems in the schooling system in that it fails to preserve the intrinsic interest in learning and exploration that a child may seem to possess during his initial phase in school. This also has severe ramifications on the education system, as it seems to almost undermine children's spontaneous interest in the process of learning itself, instead their motivation is driven by these extrinsic rewards. Research in this area suggests that parents and educators should rely on intrinsic motivation and preserve feelings of autonomy and competence as much as possible. When the task is unattractive and intrinsic motivation is insufficient (e.g., household chores), then extrinsic rewards are useful to provide incentives for behaviour.

School programs that provide money or prizes for reading books have been criticized for their potential to reduce intrinsic motivation by overjustification. However, a study of the Pizza Hut program, Book It!, found that participation in the program neither increased nor decreased reading motivation. Although motivating students to read by rewarding them may undermine their interest in reading, it may also encourage the reading skills necessary for developing an interest in reading.

=== Workplace ===
Cognitive evaluation theory further predicts the different types of rewards that will exert different effects. According to the theory, task non-contingent rewards like benefits that are based on things other than performance, such as employment that do not consist of any information regarding autonomy and competence, will have no effect on intrinsic motivation. Task contingent rewards on the other hand like salary which are awarded for performing or completing a task, will be experienced as controlling and hence will have a negative effect on intrinsic motivation. The study conducted by Deckop and Cirka reported in 2000 that introducing merit pay programs in a non-profit organization led to decreased feelings of autonomy and intrinsic motivation, indicating that rewards can undermine intrinsic motivation in work settings.

Performance contingent rewards like monetary incentives that are given for good performance or meeting a certain standard will be experienced as highly controlling hence decreasing intrinsic motivation. Shirom, Westman, and Melamed found that pay-for-performance plans resulted in lower well being in blue-collar workers, and this was especially evident for those who felt that their jobs were monotonous. However, in certain cases where the reward also conveys information about competence that will in turn reduce the negative effect.

=== Gamification ===
The term gamification refers to the application of game design elements to non-game contexts in order to drive participation, often with the goal of encouraging greater engagement with the non-game context by providing symbolic rewards such as points, badges, or virtual currency. However, a number of academics and other critics have expressed concern that these rewards may backfire via the overjustification effect. Drawing directly on self-determination theory, these critics of gamification express concerns that gamified contexts such as foursquare might provide expected rewards for activities that do not adequately meet self-determination theory's three innate needs for intrinsic motivation—relatedness, autonomy, and competence—and therefore reduce intrinsic interest in those activities.

=== Crowdsourcing ===
Websites that rely on user-generated content sometimes offer monetary rewards or user rights for contributions, but these may cause the contributors to succumb to the overjustification effect and stop contributing. For example, Amazon Mechanical Turk allows the creator of a task to offer a monetary reward, but a survey of 431 Mechanical Turk participants showed that they are driven more by intrinsic motivations than a desire for the usually meagre monetary compensation. The overjustification effect was also considered in a study on how to maximise contributions when crowdsourcing creative endeavours.

=== Volunteering ===
Empirical evidence shows that expected financial rewards "crowd out" intrinsic motivation, while the size of the monetary reward simultaneously provides extrinsic motivation. If the size of the monetary reward is not large enough to compensate for the loss of intrinsic motivation, overall engagement can decline. A survey data-set revealed that small financial payments reduced volunteer hours among Swiss citizens, and that the median financial reward provided to these volunteers caused them to work less than volunteers who were not given any payment.

=== Sports ===
The overjustification effect has also been linked to professional sports. The performance of numerous athletes has diminished following the signing of a lucrative, multimillion-dollar contract. Some notable professional athletes whose performances have diminished following a large contract include Alex Rodriguez (MLB), Albert Pujols (MLB), Wayne Rooney (Premier League) and Albert Haynesworth (NFL).

== Criticism ==
One measurement issue relates to the ecological validity of overjustification effect’s studies, questioning how well observations in laboratory can accurately reflect real-world situations. According to Eisenberger & Cameron 1996, claimed negative effects of extrinsic rewards on task interest derived from Deci 1971 study do not take into consideration that conditions manufactured in laboratory settings that produce these effects are not true reflections of situations in the real world. For example, in the Deci study the incentive was provided for one session and was then arbitrarily withdrawn in the next and such incentive plans do not exist in the real world. Also, the reduced intrinsic interest seen in subjects may be explained by a negative reaction when the reward was withheld.

Eisenberger and his colleagues also claimed that the validity of the dependent measure is highly questionable in the Deci study. Laboratory results that used the amount of free time spend on the task as the dependent measure are shown to be far weaker than when self reports are used for these measures. The Deci study gives far less weight to self reports, however self-reports about subjects' level of internal motivation seem to be a more direct measure of the psychological state of interest.

In addition to measurement concerns, differences in research design may also influence whether the overjustification effect is observable. Two major experimental approaches have been used in the above studies. First, the three-session designs. Participants first engage in an activity without rewards to establish baseline interest, then receive rewards, and are later tested again without rewards (e.g., Deci, 1971; Leeper, 1973). Second, one-session designs operate without first measuring baseline interest (e.g., Festinger & Carlsmith, 1959). These methodological differences raise potential inaccuracy because in three-session designs, participants may recall they originally engaged in the activity for enjoyment, reducing the overjustification effect. By comparison, in one-session designs, participants may attribute their behaviour to the external rewards more, making the overjustification effect seem stronger.

Moreover, the construct of intrinsic motivation itself may be too broadly defined. The decrease in intrinsic motivation observed in overjustification studies may not necessarily reflect a true loss of interest in that activity. Instead, they may imply a shift in how individuals value the task, such as viewing it more as an activity performed for responsibility rather than pure enjoyment. In this sense, motivation may not actually reduce, but rather reorganised by its meaning to the individual.

Finally, the studies provide little evidence on the influence of rewards on long-term intrinsic motivation, which is important for behavioural intervention that depends on durable behavioural change.

Given the numbers of moderators and diverse applications of the effect, researchers should call for more comprehensive and methodologically rigorous approaches when examining how rewards influence intrinsic motivation in the overjustification effect.

== See also ==
- Attribution theory
- Candle problem
- Cognitive evaluation theory
- Motivation crowding theory
- Reinforcement
- Self-determination theory
- Self-perception
- Social psychology
