= Direction de l'immobilier de l'Etat =

Direction de l'immobilier de l'Etat (DIE), formerly known as Service France Domaine, is a French government administration, which plays a central role in the property management of state-owned real estate in France. DIE acts as the owner of the state real estate, and advises various public administrations in activities related to real estate, for instance by coordinating the real estate strategy for all ministries. DIE functions under the ministry for budget (Ministère de l'Action et des Comptes Publics).

DIE is tasked with disposing property that is no longer used by the administrations, and which has become too costly or outdated to maintain. All in all, its real estate operations include buying, selling, renting, and development. Together with approximately 100 regional and local offices under the tax administration services, it performs all activities relating to the management of state property assets. The aims for DIE include to ensure that state property is efficiently managed, increasing the quality of public services, while at the same time reducing costs; and also improving the working environment for government employees.

== State real estate stock ==
The state is the largest owner of real property in France with nearly 100 million square meters and 200 000 properties (offices, houses, lands, hangar, training centers...). In 2018, the French state property assets were valued at approximately 65 billion EUR.

== Sale of state-owned real estate ==
Since 2006, the French government formed a strategy for state-owned real estate. One of the goals was to reduce government debt by selling state-owned real estate on the market. Each year, the sales yielded between 200 ans 500 million EUR. The larger part of the returns would be used as an economic incentive to economise on real estate holdings, by being partly returned to the ministries that previously occupied the property.
