= Motivation crowding theory =

Theory in psychology and microeconomics

Motivation crowding theory is the theory from psychology and microeconomics suggesting that providing extrinsic incentives for certain kinds of behavior—such as promising monetary rewards for accomplishing some task—can sometimes undermine intrinsic motivation for performing that behavior. The result of lowered motivation, in contrast with the predictions of neoclassical economics, can be an overall decrease in the total performance.

The term "crowding out" was coined by Bruno Frey in 1997, but the idea was first introduced into economics much earlier by Richard Titmuss, who argued in 1970 that offering financial incentives for certain behaviors could counter-intuitively lead to a drop in performance of those behaviors. While the empirical evidence supporting crowding out for blood donation has been mixed, there has since been a long line of psychological and economic exploration supporting the basic phenomenon.

The typical study of crowding out asks subjects to complete some task either for payment or no payment. Researchers then look to self-reported measures of motivation for completing the task, willingness to complete additional rounds of the task for no additional compensation, or both. Removing the payment incentive, compared to those who were never paid at all, typically lowers overall interest in and willingness to complete the task. This process is known as "crowding out" since whatever motivation for the task that previously existed—as estimated by the control condition that was not offered compensation for the task—has been crowded out by motivation merely based on the payment.

A 2020 study which reviewed more than 100 tests of motivation crowding theory and conducted its own field experiments found that paying individuals for intrinsically enjoyable tasks boosts their performance, but that taking payment away after it is expected may lead individuals to perform worse than if they were not paid at first.

== Development of the theory ==
=== History ===
According to research on operant conditioning and behaviorism in the 1950s, extrinsic rewards should increase the chances of the rewarded behavior occurring, with the greatest effect on behavior if the reward is given immediately after the behavior. In these studies, often removing the reward quickly led to a return to the pre-reward baseline frequency of the behavior. These findings led to popular calls for the adoption of incentives as motivational tools in a variety of professional and educational contexts. Moreover, according to standard economics, providing extrinsic incentives for a behavior has an immediate relative-price effect which should produce more of that behavior by making that behavior more attractive. Literature in economics has myriad examples of this.

However, Titmuss argued that sometimes adding incentives can actually diminish the rewarded behavior. Exploring this idea, Edward Deci noticed in the early 1970s that some actions appear to provide their own reward. These behaviors are described as being intrinsically motivated, and their enjoyment or rewards come from the act of engaging in the task itself. In this case, behavior does not require any extrinsic reward.

These observations led researchers to ask how providing extrinsic rewards for a given activity would influence intrinsic motivation toward that activity. While the relative-price effect would predict that rewards should only enhance the attractiveness of the behavior, there appeared to be indirect psychological effects of offering extrinsic incentives that, in some cases, have the opposite effect of making the behavior seem less attractive.

=== Experimental manipulations ===
==== Dependent measures ====
A wide range of behaviors has been investigated for crowding out, including completion of rote tasks, engagement with interesting puzzles, pro-social favors, creative art projects, and more. Crowding out is typically measured in two ways. First, crowding out is measured as self-reported interest in the activity after an incentive has been provided. Second, crowding out can be measured by engagement in the activity while subjects believe the experiment has ended and after full compensation has been provided. Some studies use both measures. In some cases, crowding out has been found to directly affect effort and performance on the target behavior itself even while compensated for performance. For instance, paying people a token amount of money to raise money for charity has been shown to cause people to wind up collecting less money than those who were not paid at all.

==== Independent variables ====
According to a meta-analysis, three kinds of rewards are used in the investigation of crowding out. First, task-noncontingent rewards, such as show-up fees, are offered to subjects independent of task performance or completion, simply as compensation for their time. These rewards are not expected to displace intrinsic motivation. Second, task-contingent rewards, on the other hand, are incentives on the quantity, quality, or completion of some specific behavior (e.g. solving word puzzles or collecting charitable donations). Crowding out is thought to be most significant in this case. Finally, performance-contingent rewards, incentives for achieving certain outcomes, are thought to create comparatively little crowding out because they can serve as a signal of status and achievement rather than tampering with motivation.

=== Early evidence ===
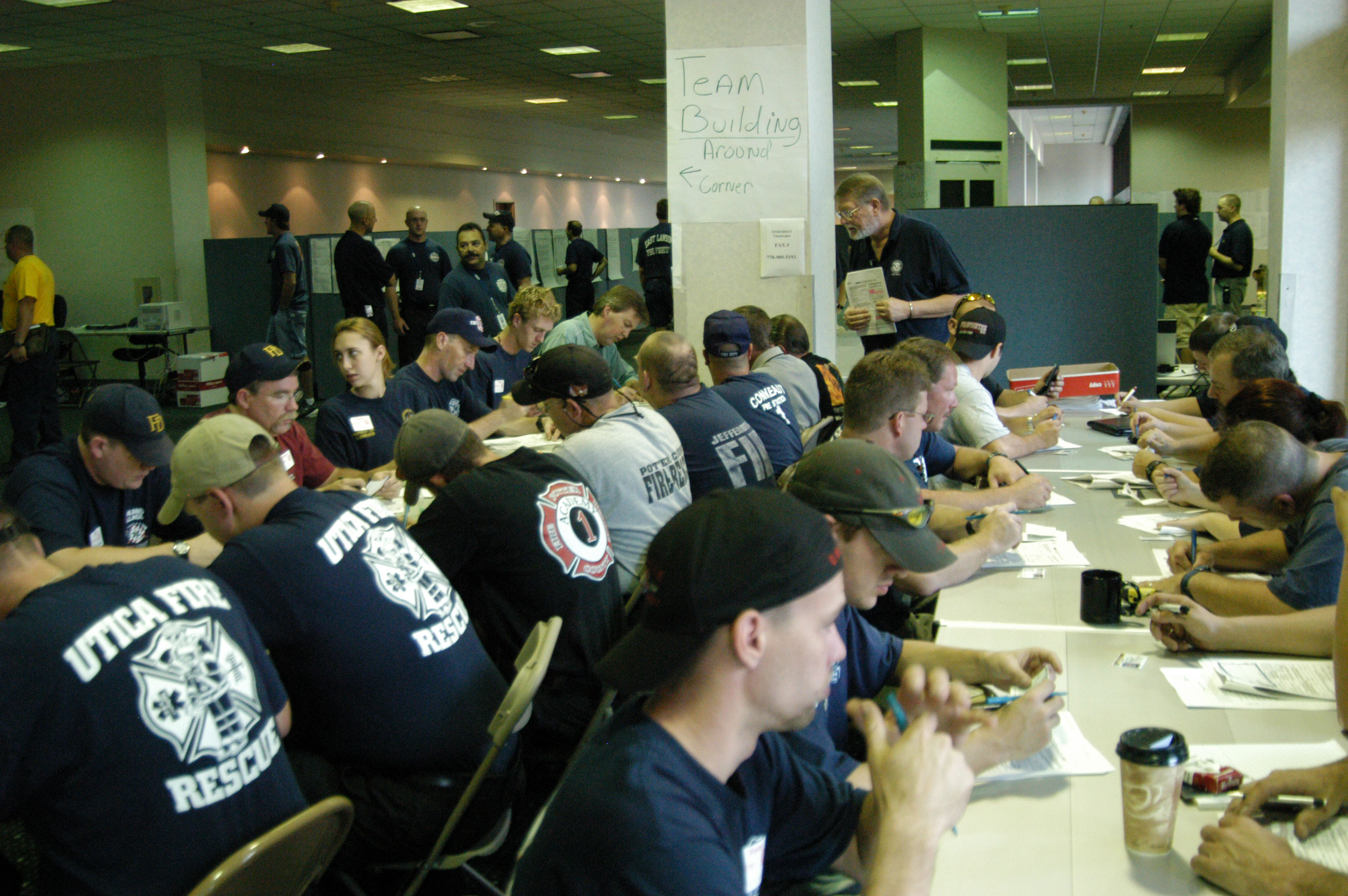
Volunteer firefighters serve alongside paid professionals in many communities. Motivation crowding theory posits that these two kinds of firefighters might perform differently based on how they are paid.

Early research in this area in the 1970s found that providing an extrinsic incentive for completing a task could undermine intrinsic motivation and subsequent effort devoted to that task across a broad range of contexts. This research considered the effect of monetary, tangible (e.g. gifts), and symbolic rewards among young children, college students, and adults doing a wide variety of tasks. In a classic study, Deci paid all subjects for participation in a psychological experiment that involved solving multiple puzzles or IQ test questions. Half of the subjects were paid a flat fee just for showing up to the experiment, but the other half of the subjects were informed that they would be paid per their completion of the study's tasks. After the presumptive experiment was over, subjects were left with free time during which they could either sit idly or complete more tasks. Deci measured the number of additional IQ questions or puzzles completed during this non-compensated time as well as self-reported measurements of interest in the task. Deci found that, compared to those who were paid simply for showing up, subjects who were paid specifically to complete the tasks were significantly less likely to complete additional non-compensated tasks and gave lower ratings of interest levels in the tasks themselves. Deci interpreted these findings to suggest that motivation for and interest in the tasks had been displaced by the provision of extrinsic incentives.

These studies typically find that if incentives are large then, once removed, they can have long-run crowding out effects. However, more recent research has found that even if workers find incentives to be insufficient then there can be short-run crowding out of the rewarded behavior too. Examples of early crowding out studies include:

- In a pioneering study, Deci had college students attempt to solve a puzzle game called a Soma cube. During Phase I of the experiment, all subjects had the opportunity to play with the cube and attempt to solve several puzzles. During Phase II, half of the subjects (control) repeated Phase I whereas the other half of subjects were paid $1 for each puzzle they could solve. During Phase III, no one was paid but experimenters interrupted participants in the middle of the session, telling them a cover story about why the experimenter needed to leave the room for a few minutes. Secretly, experimenters were able to observe how participants spent their free time. Deci found that those who had been paid during Phase II were significantly less likely to play with the cube during the free, uncompensated time during Phase III.
- In a follow-up study that replicated the basic pattern of results from 1971, Deci later found that offering verbal praise as a reward for task completion did not have a similar backfiring effect as offering a monetary reward had.
- Kruglanski et al. found that if high school students were promised an extrinsic incentive before engaging in a variety of tasks, the students showed less creativity and subsequently reported enjoying the task less compared to those who were not promised payment at the outset.
- Lepper et al. found that children who were told that they would receive a reward in exchange for drawing—something they had previously shown to be intrinsically interested in—subsequently became less interested in drawing after the reward was given, compared to those who received a reward unexpectedly or who received no reward at all.

Other research has shown that a similar effect of crowding out can occur from negative disincentives for behavior, too. For instance, economic studies have shown that increasing penalties can actually lower obedience with the law and decrease worker performance. While all of these early investigations demonstrated that providing extrinsic incentives could undermine motivation for the rewarded behavior, researchers had not yet established the psychological process involved that could explain this consistent pattern of results.

== Psychological theories ==
Various explanations have been offered for why crowding out occurs.

=== Motivational theories ===
On this view—sometimes referred to as cognitive evaluation theory—the post-behavioral significance people assign to the reward determines subsequent motivation. Deci and Ryan argue that rewards can be seen to have two components: one that controls people's behavior and thus infringes on their autonomy, and a different, status-signaling component that enhances people's sense of competence. For instance, an employee recognition award could be seen as either the reason why an employee worked so hard in a given month (i.e. to win the award) or could be seen simply as a recognition of the employee's performance in general. If an extrinsic reward for some behavior appears to be controlling (i.e. the reason a person plausibly performed that behavior), this is argued to supplant intrinsic motivation for engaging in the behavior. Insofar, however, as the extrinsic incentive is seen not as an inducement but rather as a signal of high status or high achievement in general (e.g. a merit-based award), the incentive will engender more effort without crowding out motivation. On this account, then, the extent to which a given extrinsic incentive crowds out motivation is determined by the balance of the controlling versus status-signaling nature of the awards as perceived by the actor.

=== Attributional theories ===
The application of self-perception theory to motivation suggests that people sometimes form post-behavior judgments about the causes of their actions by considering the external circumstances of their decision. While intrinsic motivation for doing the activity might be a cause, the presence of an extrinsic reward could also be sufficient for explaining a behavior. The overjustification account of motivational crowding, most prominently advanced by Lepper et al., argues that people recognize the presence of a significant extrinsic incentive, attribute their motivation for doing the rewarded activity to the reward itself, and consequently lower their feelings of intrinsic motivation toward the activity. Thus, they infer, if effort for engaging in a task becomes too onerous or if an extrinsic reward is removed, people feel less internally motivated to engage in the task compared to those who were never offered a reward for doing so.

=== Behavioral theories ===
Various attempts have been made by behaviorists to explain the apparent phenomenon of crowding out in terms of reward conditioning. Behaviors that are typically thought to be intrinsically motivated, these theories argue, are actually motivated by the social praise they tend to engender. Dickinson argues that part of the reason why these behaviors are socially praised is precisely because they are not connected with any particular reinforcers. When a person helps someone else, he argues, he receives praise in part because there does not seem to be any specific private incentive for doing helping. Thus, the introduction of a specific reinforcer such as an extrinsic reward lowers the public praise, Dickinson argues. If the loss of praise is larger than the size of the specific reinforcer, she argues, then free-choice selection of that behavior will decrease. Hence, what appears as crowding out of intrinsic motivation can instead be explained, according to these theories, by shifting perceptions and incentives.

=== Economic utility theories ===
Some have argued that certain utility functions can be modeled to explain crowding out. Bénabou and Tirole, for instance, have theoretically established that crowding out can reliably occur if an agent's utility function for some behavior is composed of three things: intrinsic motivation, extrinsic motivation, and image-signaling concerns.

==== Signals to actors ====
In a context of uncertainty or information asymmetry, rewards can signal important information to the actor. If the person offering the reward (the "principal") is presumed to know something more about the task than the person to engage in the activity (the "agent"), then offering an extrinsic reward can be seen as revealing the principal's distrust as to whether or not the action would be taken without the inducement. In this view, offering a reward is a signal that either the principal knows the task is unpleasant and otherwise would not be completed, or that the principal does not trust that the agent is sufficiently motivated without such incentives. On either interpretation, agents are understood to infer something negative about the activity which lowers their willingness to engage in it without additional incentive.

An implication of this view is that, under certain conditions, crowding in might occur. If an activity were valued poorly by an agent, an especially high premium offered might signal to the agent that this task is more valuable than the agent previously considered.

==== Signals to observers about actors' motivations ====
Additionally, the presence or absence of extrinsic incentives can be interpreted by observers as signals of an agent's motivations for engaging in some activity. To the extent that agents are concerned with cultivating an image as an altruist, the presence of extrinsic incentives can lower interest in engaging in some task that might signal non-altruistic motives. Compatible with these findings are studies showing that the effect of crowding out is greater in the case when extrinsic incentives are known publicly compared to when they are known only to the actor but not to observers.

== Debate and meta-analyses ==
Controversy was ignited when some researchers questioned whether the data support claims that motivation crowding actually occurs. Meta-analyses revealed mixed or even null overall effects of extrinsic rewards on intrinsic motivation. However, these meta-analyses have been questioned, especially for their treatment of dependent measures and failure to account for moderating variables (e.g. the kind of reward or class of dependent measure). Other meta-analyses have concluded that, once these factors are properly controlled for, motivation crowding for certain behaviors is a robust effect for certain kinds of rewards.

Through the debate, consensus seems to have emerged that crowding out reliably occurs if the following conditions are met:

- Rewards are offered in the context of pre-existing intrinsic motivation (e.g. in a pro-social setting or for interesting tasks).
- Rewards are known in advance and expected.
- Rewards are tangible.

== Applications ==
People have proposed using the insights of motivational crowding theory to change reward structures at work, in schools, for government policies, non-profits, and at home. The basic phenomenon of incentives undermining motivation, effort, and output has been demonstrated in populations of children, college students, adults, and workers, both in the lab and in the field. Crowding out has been shown to occur in teacher performance-based pay, temporary workers' effort in commission-based pay structures, charitable giving, and student scholastic performance. The collection of this evidence has led some economists to call for rethinking how governments and charitable organizations that rely on volunteers use incentives and pay-for-performance schemes. However, not all workplace incentives show evidence of crowding out. In a randomized field experiment at a technology company, rewards for approved employee suggestions increased idea quality and participation, with no evidence that intrinsic motivation was crowded out.

== See also ==
- Burnout
- Motivation
- Self-determination theory
- Self-perception theory
- Backward bending supply of labor
