= Richard M. Ryan =

American psychologist

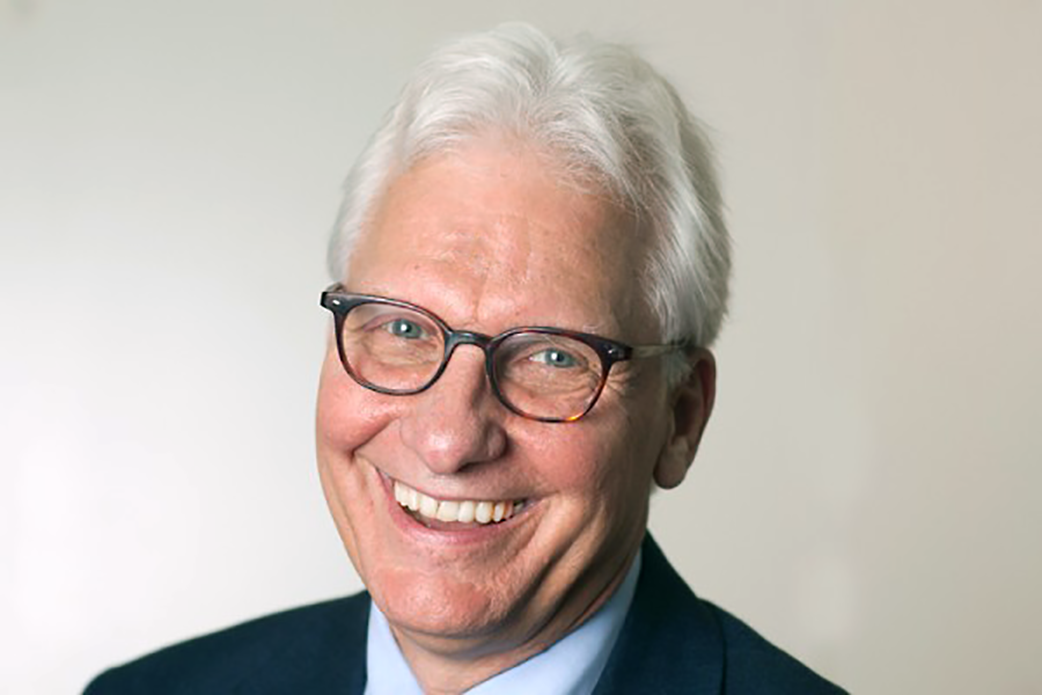
- Education: Ph.D., University of Rochester B.A., University of Connecticut
- Occupations: Professor, clinical psychologist, motivational consultant, and author
- Writing career
- Genres: Motivation, Psychology, Philosophy, Education, Business
- Notable works: Self-determination theory: Basic psychological needs in motivation, development, and wellness Intrinsic motivation and self-determination in human behavior Glued to Games
- Notable awards: 2012 Lifetime Achievement Award from International Network on Personal Meaning 2014 Distinguished Career Award, Society for Self and Identity 2015 Shavelson Distinguished Researcher and Lifetime Achievement Award from International SELF Research Centre.
- Website: selfdeterminationtheory.org

Richard M. Ryan is a professor at the Institute for Positive Psychology and Education at the Australian Catholic University and a research professor at the University of Rochester. He earned his Ph.D. in clinical psychology from the University for Rochester and his B.A. from the University of Connecticut. Ryan is a clinical psychologist and co-developer with Edward L. Deci, of Self-Determination Theory (SDT), one of the most influential theories of human motivation. SDT is a macrotheory of motivation, psychological development and wellness. The theory has spawned basic research on intrinsic and extrinsic motivation, and the facilitation and undermining of volitional motivation. SDT has been widely applied on research and interventions in work organizations, schools, clinical settings, virtual environments and sports, among other areas of application.

Ryan is one of the leading theorists of human motivation ranking among the top 1% of researchers in the field. Reflective of his influence internationally and across disciplines, he has been recognized as one of the eminent psychologists of the modern era (post-World War II), and is also featured as a top scientist in the bestseller, "Scientists Making a Difference".

Evidence of scholarly impact, Ryan is also among the most cited researchers in psychology and social sciences today having authored over 400 papers and books in the areas of human motivation, personality, and psychological well-being. His book Intrinsic motivation and self-determination in human behavior, co-authored with Edward L. Deci in 1985, has been cited over 37,000 times according to Google Scholar. His article Self-determination theory and the facilitation of intrinsic motivation, social development, and well-being was the 6th most cited Psychiatry and Psychology article of its decade. In 2017, Ryan and Deci comprehensively examine four decades of motivational research in Self-determination theory: Basic psychological needs in motivation, development and wellness. Other works by Ryan include the highly ranked, Glued to Games which is a scientific perspective of how video games motivate players.

Ryan has received three lifetime achievement awards for his contributions to the field on motivation, personal meaning, and self and identity, including the 2012 Lifetime Achievement Award from the International Network on Personal Meaning. He has earned fellowships from the Leverhulme Foundation and the James McKeen Cattell Fund, and was a visiting professor at the Max Planck Institute, The University of Bath, and the National Institute of Education at the Nanyang Technical University in Singapore. He also holds an honorary doctorate from the University of Thessaly.

He lectures frequently in the United States and abroad on Self-Determination Theory and the factors that promote motivation and healthy psychological and behavioral functioning.

He is also a co-founder of Immersyve, Inc., a motivational consulting company in Orlando, FL.

== Selected works ==
- Ryan, R. M., & Deci, E. L. (2017). Self-determination theory: Basic psychological needs in motivation, development, and wellness. New York: Guilford Publishing. ISBN 978-1-4625-2876-9
- Rigby, C. S., & Ryan, R. M. (2011). Glued to games: How video games draw us in and hold us spellbound. ISBN 978-0313362248
- Deci, Edward L. (2006). Richard M. Ryan (ed.). The Handbook of Self-Determination Research. University of Rochester Press. ISBN 1-58046-156-5
- Ryan, R. M., & Deci, E. L. (2000). "Self-determination theory and the facilitation of intrinsic motivation, social development, and well-being." American Psychologist, 55, 68-78.
- Deci, E. L., & Ryan, R. M. (2000). "The 'what' and 'why' of goal pursuits: Human needs and the self-determination of behavior." Psychological Inquiry, 11, 227-268.
- Deci, Edward L.; Ryan, Richard M. (1985). Intrinsic motivation and self-determination in human behavior. New York: Plenum. ISBN 978-0-306-42022-1.

== See also ==
- Self-determination theory
- Organismic theory
- Motivation
