= Cognitive evaluation theory =

Psychological theory on internal motivation

Cognitive evaluation theory (CET) is a theory in psychology that is designed to explain the effects of external consequences on internal motivation. Specifically, CET is a sub-theory of self-determination theory that focuses on competence and autonomy while examining how intrinsic motivation is affected by external forces in a process known as motivational "crowding out."

CET uses three propositions to explain how consequences affect internal motivation:

1. External events will impact intrinsic motivation for optimally challenging activities to the extent that they influence perceived competence, within the context of self-determination theory. Events that promote greater perceived competence will enhance intrinsic motivation, whereas those that diminish perceived competence will decrease intrinsic motivation (Deci & Ryan, 1985).
2. Events relevant to the initiation and regulation of behavior have three potential aspects, each with a significant function.

- The informational aspect facilitates an internal perceived locus of causality and perceived competence, thus positively influencing intrinsic motivation.
- The controlling aspect facilitates an external perceived locus of causality (a person's perception of the cause of success or failure), thus negatively influencing intrinsic motivation and increasing extrinsic compliance or defiance.
- The amotivating aspect facilitates perceived incompetence, and undermining intrinsic motivation while promoting disinterest in the task.

The relative salience and strength of these three aspects to a person determines the functional significance of the event (Deci & Ryan, 1985).

3. Personal events differ in their qualitative aspects and, like external events, can have differing functional significances. Events deemed internally informational facilitate self-determined functioning and maintain or enhance intrinsic motivation. Events deemed internally controlling events are experienced as pressure toward specific outcomes and undermine intrinsic motivation. Internally amotivating events make incompetence salient and also undermine intrinsic motivation (Deci & Ryan, 1985).

== Evidence for ==
Many empirical studies have given at least partial support for the ideas expressed in CET. Some examples include:

1. Vallerand and Reid (1984) found that college students' perceived competence and intrinsic motivation were increased by positive feedback and decreased by negative feedback. Further, a path analysis suggested that the effects of feedback on the students' intrinsic motivation were mediated by perceived competence.
2. Kruglanski, Alon, and Lewis (1972) found that tangible rewards decreased fifth grade children's intrinsic motivation for playing various games. The authors also attempted to measure whether or not children who received the rewards had an external locus of causality. They asked rewarded and non-rewarded children 1 week after the treatment session for their reasons for playing the games. Of the 36 rewarded children, only 2 mentioned the reward as their reason.
3. Goudas, Biddle, Fox, and Underwood (1995) tested this hypothesis with the use of different teaching styles in a physical education class. The students reported higher levels of intrinsic motivation when their track-and-field instructor offered them a number of choices throughout the lesson rather than controlling every class decision.

== Evidence against ==
Many empirical studies have given at least partial support against the ideas expressed in CET. Some examples include:

1. Many studies have found changes in intrinsic motivation without changes in perceived locus of causality or competence (Boal & Cummings, 1981; Harackiewicz, Manderlink, and Sansone, 1984).
2. Phillips and Lord (1980) found changes in perceived competence following the receipt of rewards, but no changes in intrinsic motivation.
3. Salancik (1975) found that college students rewarded with money reported internal attributions of control.
4. Abuhamdeh, Csikszentmihalyi, & Jalal (2015) Found that participants chose to replay games in which they previously experienced high suspense but low perceived competence over games in which they previously experienced high perceived competence but low suspense.

== Alternative for undermining of intrinsic motivation ==
Some behaviorist psychologists have offered up other explanations for the undermining of intrinsic motivation that has been found in support of CET. Dickinson (1989) proposed three explanations:

1. That intrinsic motivation may decrease over time due to repetitive actions. This is to say that the motivation was not undermined by an external force but was decreasing because of doing the same action over and over.
2. If the controlling actions (the reward) are negative it could negatively influence intrinsic motivation. Rewards can do this in several ways, including serving as a proxy for a punishment by withholding a reward as the reward stands as a means of coercion to complete an otherwise undesirable task.
3. Culturally, intrinsically motivated acts that have no extrinsic reward are praised by society whereas actions that receive a tangible reward are not praised as highly, which would indicate that for actions that have a tangible reward they receive less praise and this undermines their intrinsic motivation to complete the task.

Other explanations for the undermining effect include the "overjustification" effect, tested by Lepper, Greene, and Nisbett (1973). The "overjustification" effect claims that subjects will justify their actions later by investigating the causes for their own behavior, and if they were rewarded for that behavior they are likely to place an emphasis on the reward as opposed to any intrinsic motivation they might have had. Similarly, Lepper, Sagotsky, Dafoe, and Greene (1982) showed that children will develop beliefs that if they have to do one task prior to be allowing to engage in another (i.e., "clean up the dinner table before you can have dessert") that the first task is going to be uninteresting and that the second activity is preferable.

== Implications ==
The primary implication for CET is that the consequences of a reward will be a decreased level of intrinsic motivation and satisfaction because the reward is perceived to negatively impact the autonomy and competence of the individual. Tangible rewards under most conditions will negatively impact the motivation and interest of employees. However, while expected tangible rewards negatively impact motivation and satisfaction, unexpected tangible rewards do not have a negative impact because they are unexpected and thus do not influence the motivation to engage in the act. Similarly, rewards that are not dependent upon the task and are given freely are also not detrimental to motivation and satisfaction (Deci, Koestner, & Ryan, 1999).

Also, positive feedback is positively related to intrinsic motivation and satisfaction so long as the feedback is not relayed in a controlling manner. Word choice can negatively influence autonomy even under conditions of positive feedback if the feedback is given in a controlling manner, such as by indicating that someone is doing a good job and that they "should" continue the work, as opposed to simply indicating that they are performing well (Deci, Koestner, & Ryan, 1999).

However, an important finding regarding positive feedback is that positive feedback is important for adults, but not for children. In their analysis of the literature, Deci et al. (1999) found that while adults had their intrinsic motivation significantly enhanced by positive feedback, children showed no such difference. Positive feedback for children neither significantly increased nor decreased their intrinsic motivation. Despite this, perceived satisfaction with tasks was still positively impacted by positive feedback for both children and adults.

The findings of CET are usually based on the premise that the task is an interesting one so that the employee/student will want to engage in the task of their own volition, but when the task is not interesting the findings indicate that the use of rewards does not damage the intrinsic motivation or satisfaction of the employees/student to a significant degree (Deci, Koestner, & Ryan, 1999). This might indicate that under certain situations, such as when a boring task is used, tangible rewards might be appropriate.

Taken together, CET implies that under conditions involving interesting tasks positive feedback is generally a positive force on intrinsic motivation and that tangible and expected rewards are a negative force. This would indicate that when tangible rewards are to be used that they should not be made known beforehand (and therefore linked to the behavior) and that positive verbal feedback is only good when it is applied in a manner that does not threaten the autonomy of the individual. The implications of this theory have been noted in the field of economics due to its implications for incentives (Fehr & Falk, 2002) and in educational settings (Hattie & Timperley, 2007). In the educational field, the difference between children and adults in how important positive feedback is to their feelings of intrinsic motivation is an important one and will alter the application of CET between the workplace and the classroom.

== Future research ==
Future research on CET will likely look to the effect of rewards on long-term tasks as opposed to short-term tasks as this might affect the relationship between rewards and motivation; complicated and interesting tasks that occur over time might display different relationships regarding rewards and intrinsic motivation (as suggested by Hidi & Harackiewicz, 2000). Other elements to consider for future research include investigating how intrinsic versus extrinsic rewards might alter the relationship between rewards and intrinsic motivation, as the expected payoff between learning a new skill (such as learning to play the guitar) and being compensated monetarily could have different effects on intrinsic motivation (Vansteenkiste, Lens, & Deci, 2006).
