= Online shopping rewards =

Type of loyalty programme

Online shopping rewards are a type of loyalty program to e-commerce shoppers.

The advent of online shopping has resulted in the rapid development of many rewards programs that offer incentives for shopping. These programs may be points-based (redeemable for products or vouchers), cashback, airline frequent flyer-miles-based, hotel points, donations to charity, or even carbon offsets.

These programs are often presented to the consumer as coalitions of large numbers of retailers, but are probably better described as competitive loyalty programs, to differentiate them from their precursors the original single retailer non-competitive loyalty program.

== The marketing model ==
Rewards portals have grown very rapidly in most major markets, especially in the US, Canada, UK, and Australia. While they have roots in traditional off-line non-competitive loyalty programs, such portals often add considerably greater value to the customer than their traditional off-line equivalent, which accounts for their dramatic growth and high levels of customer acceptance.

Cash back and reward-based websites operate using a marketing model known as affiliate marketing, which is a performance-based marketing tool. Affiliate marketing networks make it possible to track in detail where users come from (which website is referring the customers), what users buy (down to the product) and when. Rewards-based websites track and reconcile this information with their own user database, and pass on a proportion or even all of the commission received to the customer. From the customer's perspective they are getting something back, usually at no extra cost and often with an additional discount or bonus. From the retailer's perspective, the role and costs of marketing are passed on almost entirely to the affiliate. While hundreds of thousands of websites can easily use affiliate programs to advertise products and retailers (from sports blogs, fanzines through to almost any niche website), cash back and rewards-based programs are much fewer in number, because of the need to track, store, and retrieve individual customer information with a high degree of precision.

== Typology ==
A particular typology is the incentive program. Online shopping programs tend to be consumer-oriented points-based or cash back programs. Traditional programs focus their proposition on extrinsic motivation and rewards: cash back or a choice of attractive rewards. A variant, though not unique to online shopping programs, is the intrinsic reward. Cause related websites, much like affinity credit card schemes, give their users the opportunity to donate the cash or points to a charity, school, or club. Others still give their users a range of options. With consumer concern about climate change growing, a number of green rewards shopping portals have appeared. Instead of cash back or points these websites offer carbon credits (also known as carbon offsets) or green gadgets to encourage consumers to shop with particular retailers or make changes to their lifestyle.

== Criticisms ==
Points-based web sites may have different currencies, which makes it difficult to compare the customer benefit. Most reward websites retain a proportion of the commission, and only industry insiders are aware of the nuances of the business model used and therefore the customer benefit.

From the consumer's perspective it may not always be clear whether the benefit going to the supported cause is the most effective way of raising funds. For example, in some countries like the UK, a significant tax benefit can be provided to the charity by donating in cash.

While the majority of green reward websites also offer some useful information and advice on greener living, few of them seem to encourage more sustainable consumption.

== See also ==
- Affiliate marketing
- Cashback website
- Loyalty program
- Sales promotion
- Frequent flyer program
