= Self-determination theory =

Macro theory of human motivation and personality

Self-determination theory (SDT) is a macro theory of human motivation and personality regarding individuals' innate tendencies toward growth and innate psychological needs. It pertains to the motivation behind individuals' choices in the absence of external influences and distractions. SDT focuses on the degree to which human behavior is self-motivated and self-determined.

In the 1970s, the research that led to SDT evolved from studies comparing intrinsic and extrinsic motives and a growing understanding of the dominant role that intrinsic motivation plays in individual behavior. It was not until the mid-1980s, when Edward L. Deci and Richard Ryan wrote a book entitled Intrinsic Motivation and Self-Determination in Human Behavior, that SDT was formally introduced and recognized as having empirical support. Since the 2000s, research into practical applications of SDT has increased significantly.

SDT is rooted in the psychology of intrinsic motivation, drawing upon the complexities of human motivation and the factors that foster or hinder autonomous engagement in activities. Intrinsic motivation refers to initiating an activity because it is interesting and satisfying to do so, as opposed to doing an activity to obtain an external goal (i.e., from extrinsic motivation). A taxonomy of motivations has been described based on the degree to which they are internalized. Internalization refers to the active attempt to transform an extrinsic motive into personally endorsed values and thus assimilate behavioral regulations that were originally external.

Deci and Ryan later expanded on their early work distinguishing intrinsic from extrinsic motivation, and proposed three basic psychological needs involved in self-determination: autonomy, competence, and relatedness. According to Deci and Ryan, these three basic psychological needs motivate self-initiated behavior and specify essential nutrients for individual psychological health and well-being. These needs are said to be universal and innate.

SDT has been applied in many areas, including education, health care, sport, and the workplace. In education and health care, large meta-analyses have linked more autonomous forms of motivation to better outcomes. The theory has also drawn criticism and debate, including over whether rewards reliably undermine intrinsic motivation, how it types of motivation should be measured, and whether autonomy is equally important across cultures.

== Self-determination theory ==
Humanistic psychology has been influential in the creation of SDT. Humanistic psychology is interested in looking at a person's psyche and personal achievement for self-efficacy and self-actualization. Whether or not an individual's self-efficacy and self-actualization are fulfilled can affect their motivation.

SDT acknowledges the importance of the interconnection of intrinsic and extrinsic motivations as a means of motivation to achieve a goal. With the acknowledgment of interconnection of motivations, SDT forms the belief that extrinsic motivations and the motivations of others, such as a therapist, may be beneficial. However, it is more important for people to find the "why" behind the desired goal within themselves. According to Sheldon et al., "Therapists who fully endorse self-determination principles acknowledge the limits of their responsibilities because they fully acknowledge that ultimately people must make their own choices" (2003, p. 125).

SDT comprises the organismic dialectical approach, which is a meta-theory, and a formal theory containing mini-theories focusing on the connection between extrinsic and intrinsic motivations within society and an individual. SDT is continually being developed as researchers incorporate the findings of more recent research. As SDT has developed, more mini-theories have been added to what was originally proposed by Deci and Ryan in 1985. Generally, SDT is described as having either five or six mini-theories. The main five mini-theories are cognitive evaluation theory, organismic integration theory, causality orientations theory, basic needs theory, and goal contents theory. The sixth mini-theory that some sources include in SDT is called relational motivation theory (RMT).

SDT centers around the belief that human nature shows persistent positive features, with people repeatedly showing effort, agency, and commitment in their lives that the theory calls inherent growth tendencies. Self-determination also has a more personal and psychology-relevant meaning today: the ability or process of making one's own choices and controlling one's own life.

=== Summary of the SDT mini-theories ===
1. Cognitive evaluation theory (CET): explains the relationship between internal motivation and external rewards. According to CET, when external rewards are controlling, when they pressure individuals to act a certain way, they diminish internal motivation. On the other hand, when external motivations are informational and provide feedback about behaviors, they increase internal motivation.
2. Organismic integration theory (OIT): suggests different types of extrinsic motivations and how they contribute to the socialization of the individual. This mini-theory suggests that people willingly participate in activities and behaviors that they do not find interesting or enjoyable because they are influenced by external motivators. The four types of extrinsic motivations proposed in this theory are external regulation, introjected regulation, identified regulation, and integrated regulation.
3. Causality orientations theory (COT): explores individual differences in the way people motivate themselves in regards to their personality. COT suggests three orientations toward decision making which are determined by identifying the motivational forces behind an individual's decisions. Individuals can have an autonomy orientation and make choices according to their own interests and values, they may have a control orientation and make decisions based on the different pressures that they experience from internal and external demands, or they may have an impersonal orientation where they are overcome with feelings of helplessness which are accompanied by a belief that their decisions will not make a difference on the outcome of their lives.
4. Basic needs theory (BNT): considers three psychological needs that are related to intrinsic motivation: effective functioning, high quality engagement, and psychological well-being. The first psychological need is autonomy or the belief that one can choose their own behaviors and actions. The second psychological need is competence. In this sense, competence is when one is able to work effectively as they master their capacity to interact with the environment. The third psychological need proposed in basic needs theory is relatedness, or the need to form strong relationships or bonds with people who are around an individual.
5. Goal contents theory (GCT): compares the benefits of intrinsic goals to the negative outcomes of external goals in terms of psychological well-being. Key to this mini-theory is understanding what reasoning lies behind an individual's goals. Individuals who pursue goals as a way to satisfy their needs have intrinsic goals and over time experience need satisfaction while those who pursue goals in search of validation have external goals and do not experience need satisfaction.
6. Relationship motivation theory (RMT): examines the importance of relationships. This theory posits that high quality relationships satisfy all three psychological needs described in BNT. Of the three needs, relatedness is impacted the most by high quality relationships but autonomy and competence are satisfied as well. This is because high quality relationships are able to provide individuals with a bond to another person while simultaneously reinforcing their needs for autonomy and competence.

== Organismic dialectical perspective ==
The organismic dialectical perspective sees all humans as active organisms interacting with their environment. People are actively growing, striving to overcome challenges, and creating new experiences. While endeavoring to become unified from within, individuals also become part of social structures. SDT also suggests that people have innate psychological needs that are the basis for self-motivation and personality integration. Through further explanation, people search for fulfillment in their 'meaning of life'. Discovering the meaning of life constitutes a distinctive desire that one possesses, a desire to find purpose and aim in their lives, which enhances their perception of themselves and their surroundings. Not only does SDT tend to focus on innate psychological needs, it also focuses on the pursuit of goals, the effects of the success in their goals, and the outcome of goals.

== Basic psychological needs ==
One mini-theory of SDT includes basic psychological needs theory which proposes three basic psychological needs that must be satisfied to foster well-being and health. These three psychological needs of autonomy, competence, and relatedness are generally universal (i.e., apply across individuals and situations). However, some needs may be more salient than others at certain times and be expressed differently based on time, culture, or experience. SDT identifies three innate needs that, if satisfied, allow optimal function and growth:

=== Autonomy ===
- Desire to be causal agents of one's own life and act in harmony with one's integrated self; however, note this does not mean to be independent of others, but rather constitutes a feeling of overall psychological liberty and freedom of internal will. When a person is autonomously motivated their performance, wellness, and engagement is heightened rather than if a person is told what to do (a.k.a. control motivation).

Deci found that offering people extrinsic rewards for behavior that is intrinsically motivated undermined the intrinsic motivation as they grow less interested in it. Initially intrinsically motivated behavior becomes controlled by external rewards, which undermines their autonomy. In further research by Amabile et al. other external factors also appear to cause a decline in such motivation. For example, it is shown that deadlines restrict and control an individual which decreases their intrinsic motivation in the process.

Situations that give autonomy as opposed to taking it away also have a similar link to motivation. Studies looking at choice have found that increasing a participant's options and choices increases their intrinsic motivation. Direct evidence for the innate need comes from Lübbecke and Schnedler who find that people are willing to pay money to have caused an outcome themselves. Additionally, satisfaction or frustration of autonomy impacts not only an individual's motivation, but also their growth. This satisfaction or frustration further affects behavior, leading to optimal well-being, or unfortunate ill-being.

=== Competence ===
Sources:

- Seek to control the outcome and experience mastery.

Deci found that giving people unexpected positive feedback on a task increases their intrinsic motivation to do it, meaning that this was because positive feedback fulfilled people's need for competence. Additionally, SDT influences the fulfillment of meaning-making, well-being, and finding value within internal growth and motivation. Giving positive feedback on a task served only to increase people's intrinsic motivation and decreased extrinsic motivation for the task.

Vallerand and Reid found negative feedback has the opposite effect (i.e., decreasing intrinsic motivation by taking away from people's need for competence). In a study conducted by Felnhofer et al., the level of competence and view of attributing competence is judged in regards to the scope of age differences, gender, and attitude variances of an individual within a given society. The effect of the different variances between individuals subsidize the negative influence that may lead to decreasing intrinsic motivation.

=== Relatedness ===
- Will to interact with, be connected to, and experience caring for others.

During a study on the relationship between infants' attachment styles, their exhibition of mastery-oriented behaviour, and their affect during play, Frodi, Bridges and Grolnick failed to find significant effects: "Perhaps somewhat surprising was the finding that the quality of attachment assessed at 12 months failed to significantly predict either mastery motivation, competence, or affect 8 months later, when other investigators have demonstrated an association between similar constructs ..." Yet they note that larger sample sizes could be able to uncover such effects: "A comparison of the secure/stable and the insecure/stable groups, however, did suggest that the secure/stable group was superior to the insecure/stable groups on all mastery-related measures. Obviously, replications of all the attachment-motivation relations are needed with different and larger samples."

Deci and Ryan claim that there are three essential elements of the theory:

1. Humans are inherently proactive with their potential and mastery of their inner forces (such as drives and emotions)
2. Humans have an inherent tendency toward growth development and integrated functioning
3. Optimal development and actions are inherent in humans but they do not happen automatically

In an additional study focusing on the relatedness of adolescents, connection to other individuals' predisposed behaviors from relatedness satisfaction or frustration. The fulfillment or dissatisfaction of relatedness either promotes necessary psychological functioning or undermines developmental growth through deprivation. Across both study examples, the essential need for nurturing from a social environment goes beyond obvious and simple interactions for adolescents and promotes the actualization of inherent potential.

If this happens, there are positive consequences (e.g. well-being and growth) but if not, there are negative consequences (e.g. dissatisfaction and deprivation). SDT emphasizes humans' natural growth toward positive motivation, development, and personal fulfillment. However, this prevents the SDT's purpose if the basic needs go unfulfilled. Although thwarting of an individual's basic needs might occur, recent studies argue that such prevention has its own influence on well-being.

== Motivations ==
SDT claims to offer a different approach to motivation, considering what motivates a person at any given time, rather than viewing motivation as a single concept. SDT makes distinctions between different types of motivation and what results from them. White and deCharms proposed that the need for competence and autonomy is the basis of intrinsic motivation and behaviour. This idea is a link between people's basic needs and their motivations.

=== Intrinsic motivation ===
Intrinsic motivation is the natural, inherent drive to seek out challenges and new possibilities that SDT associates with cognitive and social development.

Cognitive evaluation theory (CET) is a sub-theory of SDT that specifies factors explaining intrinsic motivation and variability with it and looks at how social and environmental factors help or hinder intrinsic motivations. CET focuses on the needs of competence and autonomy. CET is offered as an explanation of the phenomenon known as motivational "crowding out".

Claiming social context events like feedback on work or rewards lead to feelings of competence and so enhance intrinsic motivations. Deci found positive feedback enhanced intrinsic motivations and negative feedback diminished it. Vallerand and Reid went further and found that these effects were being mediated by perceived control.

Autonomy, however, must accompany competence for people to see their behaviours as self determined by intrinsic motivation. There must be immediate contextual support for both needs or inner resources based on prior development for this to happen.

CET and intrinsic motivation are also linked to relatedness through the hypothesis that intrinsic motivation flourishes if linked with a sense of security and relatedness. Grolnick and Ryan found lower intrinsic motivation in children who believed their teachers to be uncaring or cold and so not fulfilling their relatedness needs.

There is an interesting correlation between intrinsic motivation and educational performance according to Augustyniak, et al. They studied intrinsic motivation in second year medical students and discovered that students with lower intrinsic motivation had lower test scores and overall grades. They also noted these students lacked interest and enjoyment in their studies. They suggest that it may be beneficial to find out if a student lacks intrinsic motivation when they are younger and it may be possible to develop as they grow up.

=== Extrinsic motivation ===
Extrinsic motivation comes from external sources. Deci and Ryan developed organismic integration theory (OIT) as a sub-theory of SDT to explain the different ways extrinsically motivated behaviour is regulated.

OIT details the different forms of extrinsic motivation and the contexts in which they come about. The context of such motivation concerns the SDT theory as these contexts affect whether the motivations are internalised and so integrated into the sense of self.

OIT describes four different types of extrinsic motivations that often vary in terms of their relative autonomy:

1. Externally regulated behaviour: Is the least autonomous, it is performed because of external demand or possible reward. Such actions can be seen to have an externally perceived locus of control.
2. Introjected regulation of behaviour: describes taking on regulations to behaviour but not fully accepting said regulations as your own. Deci and Ryan claim such behaviour normally represents regulation by contingent self-esteem, citing ego involvement as a classic form of introjections. This is the kind of behaviour where people feel motivated to demonstrate ability to maintain self-worth. While this is internally driven, introjected behavior has an external perceived locus of causality or not coming from one's self. Since the causality of the behavior is perceived as external, the behavior is considered non-self-determined.
3. Regulation through identification: a more autonomously driven form of extrinsic motivation. It involves consciously valuing a goal or regulation so that said action is accepted as personally important.
4. Integrated Regulation: Is the most autonomous kind of extrinsic motivation. Occurring when regulations are fully assimilated with self so they are included in a person's self-evaluations and beliefs on personal needs. Because of this, integrated motivations share qualities with intrinsic motivation but are still classified as extrinsic because the goals that are trying to be achieved are for reasons extrinsic to the self, rather than the inherent enjoyment or interest in the task.

Extrinsically motivated behaviours can be integrated into self. OIT proposes that internalization is more likely to occur when there is a sense of relatedness.

Ryan, Stiller and Lynch found that children internalize school's extrinsic regulations when they feel secure and cared for by parents and teachers.

Internalisation of extrinsic motivation is also linked to competence. OIT suggests that feelings of competence in activities should facilitate internalisation of said actions.

Autonomy is particularly important when trying to integrate its regulations into a person's sense of self. If an external context allows a person to integrate regulation—they must feel competent, related and autonomous. They must also understand the regulation in terms of their other goals to facilitate a sense of autonomy. This was supported by Deci, Eghrari, Patrick and Leone who found in laboratory settings if a person was given a meaningful reason for uninteresting behaviour along with support for their sense of autonomy and relatedness they internalized and integrated their behaviour.

== Individual differences ==
SDT argues that needs are innate but can be developed in a social context or learned from various life experiences and outside influences. Some people develop stronger needs than others, creating individual differences in the needs of people, whether it be autonomy, relatedness, or competence. However, individual differences within the theory focus on concepts resulting from the degree to which needs have been satisfied or not satisfied. This has the potential to lead to either need satisfaction or need frustration. Depending on which is reached, there can either be positive or negative outcomes, which vary between individual to individual and what their needs may be.

Within SDT there are two general individual difference concepts, causality orientations and life goals, which will be discussed in further detail below.

=== Causality orientations ===
Causality orientations are motivational orientations that refer to the way people interact and adapt to an environment and regulate their behavior in response to these adaptations; in other words, this is the extent to which people experience feelings related to self-determination across many settings. SDT created three orientations: autonomous, controlled and impersonal. This orientation helps to explain the consequences of these interactions with the environment. The orientation an individual holds dictates how that person will adapt.

Autonomous orientations refer to the results from satisfaction of the basic needs. An individual's interactions with the environment will be oriented towards trying to satisfy those needs. They will adapt their behaviors in response to the environment that they find themselves in. Certain environments may require more heightened and more conscious effort in order to achieve their needs while others may not. Either way, the individual has oriented themselves and their behaviors, whether consciously or subconsciously, towards achieving their basic needs.

Strong controlled orientations come as a result of competence and relatedness needs but excludes autonomy; there is a link to regulation through both internal and external contingencies. This causes rigid functioning and diminished well-being, which are more negative outcomes rather than positive.

Impersonal orientations come from failure to fulfill all three needs, which leads to poor functioning and ill-being. According to the self-determination theory, each individual has each of these orientations to some extent. This makes it possible to predict their psychological and behavioral outcomes. When needs are satisfied, it has been shown to improve vitality, life satisfaction, and positive affect. On the other hand, need frustration can lead to more negative outcomes, such as emotional exhaustion.

The causality orientations may have various and unique impacts on an individual's motivation. In one particular study, participants were presented a puzzle and asked to put it together. And, what researchers found was that those who were more oriented towards autonomy would put in more time into solving the puzzle as compared to their counterparts. Feedback was also an important contributing factor to the success and motivation of the participants.

=== Life goals ===
Life goals are long-term goals people use to guide an individual's activities. They may fit into a variety of different categories and vary from person to person. The period of time that the particular goal will also be different depending on the nature of the goal. Some goals may take decades while other may take a couple years. There have even been instances where a goal can last a lifetime and will not be fully achieved until the individual passes. These goals can be divided into two separate categories:

1. Intrinsic Aspirations: Contain life goals like affiliation, generativity and personal development.
2. Extrinsic Aspirations: Have life goals like wealth, fame and attractiveness.

There have been several studies on this subject that chart intrinsic goals being associated with greater health, well-being and performance. Intrinsic motivation has also been shown to be a better motivator, especially in relation to long-term goals as it leaves all motivation to be on an internal basis. It does not rely on external factors, that are typically temporary, to provide the necessary drive to complete a task. With intrinsic aspirations, they would relate to things that are more values rather than material things or have material manifestations, which fits with the examples provided. These life goals can also be related back to the needs that are stronger for the individual and that they are more motivated to satisfy. For example, the goal of affiliation would fit into the category of the need for relatedness. Wealth, on the other hand, would fit more under the category of competence.

=== The connection ===
Both of these aspects can be related to many important aspects in a person's life. The causality orientations held by an individual will have an impact on their life goals, including the type of goal and if they will be able to achieve it. An example of this is job engagement and its relationship to the number of resources available to employees. The researchers conducting this study found that "the autonomous and impersonal orientations were shown to moderate the relationship between job resources and work engagement; the positive relationship was weaker for both highly autonomy-oriented and highly impersonal-oriented individuals. The interaction between controlled orientation and job resources was insignificant." So, those in these work environments will have various life goals related to their work. And, depending on their orientation, may be able to better navigate the various aspects related to how well they can perform their job. Learned helplessness may even come into play with the motivation individuals may be.

== Classic studies ==
=== Deci (1971): External rewards on intrinsic motivation ===
Deci studied the effect of extrinsic rewards on intrinsic motivation in two labs and a field experiment. Based on the results from earlier animal and human studies on intrinsic motivation, the author explored two possibilities. In the first two experiments he looked at the effect of extrinsic rewards in terms of a decrease in intrinsic motivation to perform a task. Earlier studies showed contradictory or inconclusive findings regarding decrease in performance on a task following an external reward. The third experiment was based on findings of developmental learning theorists and looked at whether a different type of reward enhances intrinsic motivation to participate in an activity.

==== Experiment I ====
This experiment tested the hypothesis that if an individual is intrinsically motivated to perform an activity, introduction of an extrinsic reward decreases the degree of intrinsic motivation to perform the task.

Twenty-four undergraduate psychology students participated in the first laboratory experiment and were assigned to either an experimental (n = 12) or control group (n = 12). Each group participated in three sessions conducted on three different days. During the sessions, participants were engaged in working on a Soma cube puzzle—which the experimenters assumed was an activity college students would be intrinsically motivated to do. The puzzle could be put together to form numerous different configurations. In each session, the participants were shown four different configurations drawn on a piece of paper and were asked to use the puzzle to reproduce the configurations while they were being timed.

The first and third session of the experimental condition were identical to control, but in the second session the participants in the experimental condition were given a dollar for completing each puzzle within time. During the middle of each session, the experimenter left the room for eight minutes and the participants were told that they were free to do whatever they wanted during that time, while the experimenter observed during that period. The amount of time spent working on the puzzle during the free choice period was used to measure motivation.

As Deci expected, when external reward was introduced during session two, the participants spent more time working on the puzzles during the free choice period in comparison to session 1 and when the external reward was removed in the third session, the time spent working on the puzzle dropped lower than the first session. All subjects reported finding the task interesting and enjoyable at the end of each session, providing evidence for the experimenter's assumption that the task was intrinsically motivating for the college students. The study showed some support of the experimenter's hypothesis and a trend towards a decrease in intrinsic motivation was seen after money was provided to the participants as an external reward.

==== Experiment II ====
The second experiment was a field experiment, similar to laboratory Experiment I, but was conducted in a natural setting.

Eight student workers were observed at a college biweekly newspaper. Four of the students served as a control group and worked on Fridays. The experimental group worked on Tuesdays.

The control and experimental group students were not aware that they were being observed. The 10-week observation was divided into three time periods. The task in this study required the students to write headlines for the newspaper.

During "Time 2", the students in the experimental group were given 50 cents for each headline they wrote. At the end of Time 2, they were told that in the future the newspaper cannot pay them 50 cent for each headline anymore as the newspaper ran out of the money allocated for that and they were not paid for the headlines during Time 3.

The speed of task completion (headlines) was used as a measure of motivation in this experiment. Absences were used as a measure of attitudes.

To assess the stability of the observed effect, the experimenter observed the students again (Time 4) for two weeks. There was a gap of five weeks between Time 3 and Time 4. Due to absences and change in assignment etc., motivation data was not available for all students. The results of this experiment were similar to Experiment I and monetary reward was found to decrease the intrinsic motivation of the students, supporting Deci's hypothesis.

==== Experiment III ====
Experiment III was also conducted in the laboratory and was identical to Experiment I in all respects except for the kind of external reward provided to the students in the experimental condition during Session 2.

In this experiment, verbal praise was used as an extrinsic reward.

The experimenter hypothesized that a different type of reward—i.e., social approval in the form of verbal reinforcement and positive feedback for performing the task that a person is intrinsically motivated to perform—enhances the degree of external motivation, even after the extrinsic reward is removed.

The results of the experiment III confirmed the hypothesis and the students' performance increased significantly during the third session in comparison to session one, showing that verbal praise and positive feedback enhances performance in tasks that a person is initially intrinsically motivated to perform. This provides evidence that verbal praise as an external reward increases intrinsic motivation.

The author explained differences between the two types of external rewards as having different effects on intrinsic motivation. When a person is intrinsically motivated to perform a task and money is introduced to work on the task, the individual cognitively re-evaluates the importance of the task and the intrinsic motivation to perform the task (because the individual finds it interesting) shifts to extrinsic motivation and the primary focus changes from enjoying the task to gaining financial reward. However, when verbal praise is provided in a similar situation, it increases intrinsic motivation as it is not evaluated to be controlled by external factors and the person sees the task as an enjoyable task that is performed autonomously. The increase in intrinsic motivation is explained by positive reinforcement and an increase in perceived locus of control to perform the task.

=== Pritchard et al. (1977): Evaluation of Deci's Hypothesis ===
Pritchard et al. conducted a similar study to evaluate Deci's hypothesis regarding the role of extrinsic rewards on decreasing intrinsic motivation.

Participants were randomly assigned to two groups. A chess-problem task was used in this study. Data was collected in two sessions.

==== Session I ====
Participants were asked to complete a background questionnaire that included questions on the amount of time the participant played chess during the week, the number of years that the participant has been playing chess for, amount of enjoyment the participant gets from playing the game, etc.

The participants in both groups were then told that the experimenter needed to enter the information in the computer and for the next 10 minutes the participant were free to do whatever they liked.

The experimenter left the room for 10 minutes. The room had similar chess-problem tasks on the table, some magazines as well as coffee was made available for the participants if they chose to have it.

The time spent on the chess-problem task was observed through a one way mirror by the experimenter during the 10 minute break and was used as a measure of intrinsic motivation. After the experimenter returned, the experimental group was told that there was a monetary reward for the participant who could work on the most chess problems in the given time and that the reward is for this session only and would not be offered during the next session. The control group was not offered a monetary reward.

==== Session II ====
The second session was the same for the two groups:

After a filler task, the experimenter left the room for 10 minutes and the time participants spent on the chess-problem task was observed. The experimental group was reminded that there was no reward for the task this time.

After both sessions the participants were required to respond to questionnaires evaluating the task, i.e. to what degree did they find the task interesting. Both groups reported that they found the task interesting.

The results of the study showed that the experimental group showed a significant decrease in time spent on the chess-problem task during the 10-minute free time from session 1 to session 2 in comparison to the group that was not paid, thus confirming the hypothesis presented by Deci that contingent monetary reward for an activity decreases the intrinsic motivation to perform that activity. Other studies were conducted around this time focusing on other types of rewards as well as other external factors that play a role in decreasing intrinsic motivation.

== New developments ==
Principles of SDT have been applied in many domains of life, e.g., job demands; parenting; teaching; health; including willingness to be vaccinated; morality; and technology design. Additionally, SDT research has been widely applied to the field of sports.

=== Exercise and physical activity ===
Murcia and colleagues looked at the influence of peers on enjoyment in exercise. Specifically, they looked at the effect of motivational climate generated by peers on exercisers by analyzing data collected through questionnaires and rating scales. The assessment included an evaluation of motivational climate, basic psychological needs satisfaction, levels of self-determination and self-regulation (amotivation and external, introjected, identified, and intrinsic regulation), and the assessment of the level of satisfaction and enjoyment in exercising.

Data analysis revealed that when peers are supportive and emphasize cooperation, effort, and personal improvement, the climate influences variables like basic psychological needs, motivation, and enjoyment. The task climate positively predicted the three basic psychological needs (i.e., competence, autonomy, and relatedness) and positively predicted self-determined motivation. Task climate and the resulting self-determination were also found to positively influence the level of enjoyment that exercisers experienced during the activity.

Behzadniaa and colleagues studied how physical education teachers' autonomy support versus control would relate to students' wellness, knowledge, performance, and intentions to persist at physical activity beyond the physical education classes. The study concluded that "perceived autonomy support was positively related to the positive outcomes via need satisfaction and frustration and autonomous motivation, and that perceptions of teachers' control were related to students' ill-being (positively) and knowledge (negatively) through need frustration."

Identified regulation was found to be more consistently associated with regular physical activity than other forms of autonomous motivation, such as intrinsic regulation, which may be triggered by pleasure derived from the activity itself. This may be explained by physical activity often relating to more mundane or repetitive actions. More recent studies suggest that different types of motivation regulate different intensities of physical activity, which may be context-dependent. For example, a higher frequency of vigorous physical activity was associated with autonomous motivation but not with controlled motivation in a study in rural Uganda. In an urban disadvantaged South African population, however, an association between moderate physical activity and autonomous motivation was found, but not with vigorous physical activity. The latter study also found the association between the basic psychological needs and more autonomous forms of motivation to be different across different contexts.

=== Awareness ===
Awareness has always been associated with autonomous functioning. However, SDT researchers just recently incorporated the concept of mindfulness and its relationship with autonomous functioning and emotional well-being into their studies.

Brown and Ryan conducted a series of five experiments to study mindfulness: They defined mindfulness as open, undivided attention to what is happening within and around oneself. From their experiments, the authors concluded that when people act mindfully, their actions are consistent with their values and interests. Also, it is possible that being autonomous and performing an action because it is enjoyable to oneself increases mindful attention to one's actions.

=== Vitality and self-regulation ===
Another area of interest for SDT researchers is the relationship between subjective vitality and self-regulation. Ryan and Deci define vitality as energy available to the self, either directly or indirectly, from basic psychological needs. This energy allows individuals to act autonomously.

Many theorists have posited that self-regulation depletes energy, but SDT researchers have proposed and demonstrated that only controlled regulation depletes energy; autonomous regulation can actually be vitalizing.

Ryan and colleagues used SDT to explain the effect of weekends on the well-being of adult working population. The study determined that people felt higher well-being on weekends due to greater feelings of autonomy and feeling closer to others (i.e., relatedness) in weekend activities.

=== Education ===
In a study by Hyungshim Jang, the capacity of two different theoretical models of motivation were used to explain why an externally provided rationale for doing a particular assignment often helps in a student's motivation, engagement, and learning during relatively uninteresting learning activities.

Undergraduate students (N = 136; 108 women, 28 men) worked on a relatively uninteresting short lesson after receiving or not receiving a rationale. Students who received the rationale showed greater interest, work ethic, and determination.

Structural equation modeling was used to test three alternative explanatory models to understand why the rationale produced such benefits:

1. An identified regulation model based on SDT;
2. An interest regulation model based on interest-enhancing strategies research;
3. An additive model that integrated both models.

The data fit all three models, but only the SDT model helped students engage and learn. Findings show that externally provided rationales can play in assisting students in generating the motivation they need to engage in and learn from uninteresting but personally important material.

The importance of these findings to those in the field of education is that when teachers try to find ways to promote students' motivation during relatively uninteresting learning activities, they can successfully do so by promoting the value of the task. Teachers can help students value what they deem "uninteresting" by providing a rationale that identifies the lesson's otherwise hidden value, helps students understand why the lesson is genuinely worth their effort, and communicates why the lesson can be expected to be useful to them.

An example of SDT and education is Sudbury schools, wherein students decide for themselves how to spend their days. In these schools, students of all ages determine what they do and when, how, and where they do it. This freedom is at the heart of the school; it belongs to the students as their right not to be violated. The fundamental premises of the school are simple: that all people are curious by nature; that the most efficient, long-lasting, and profound learning takes place when started and pursued by the learner; that all people are creative if they are allowed to develop their unique talents; that age-mixing among students promotes growth in all members of the group; and that freedom is essential to the development of personal responsibility. In practice, this means that students initiate all their own activities and create their own environments. The physical plant, the staff, and the equipment are there for the students to use as the need arises. The school provides a setting in which students are independent, are trusted, and are treated as responsible people; and a community in which students are exposed to the complexities of life in the framework of a participatory democracy. Sudbury schools do not perform and do not offer evaluations, assessments, or recommendations, asserting that they do not rate people and that the school is not a judge; comparing students to each other or to some standard that has been set is for them a violation of the student's right to privacy and to self-determination. Students decide for themselves how to measure their progress as self-starting learners as a process of self-evaluation: real lifelong learning and the proper educational evaluation for the 21st century, they adduce.

=== Alcohol use ===
According to SDT, individuals who attribute their actions to external circumstances rather than internal mechanisms are far more likely to succumb to peer pressure. In contrast, individuals who consider themselves autonomous tend to be initiators of actions rather than followers. Research examining the relationship between SDT and alcohol use among college students has indicated that individuals with the former criteria for decision-making are associated with greater alcohol consumption and drinking as a function of social pressure. For instance, in a study conducted by Knee and Neighbors, external factors in the individuals who claim not to be motivated by internal factors were found to be associated with drinking for extrinsic reasons and with stronger perceptions of peer pressure, which in turn was related to heavier alcohol use. Given the evidence suggesting a positive association between outward motivation and drinking and the potential role of perceived social influence in this association, understanding the precise nature of this relationship seems important. Further, it may be hypothesized that the relationship between self-determination and drinking may be mediated to some extent by the perceived approval of others.

=== Healthy eating ===
Self-determination theory offers an explanatory framework to predict healthy eating and other dietary behaviors. Research on SDT in the domain of eating regulation is still in its early stages and most of these studies were conducted in high-income settings. In support of SDT, A recent study in an urban township population in South Africa found that frequency of fruit, vegetable, and non-refined starch intake was associated with identified regulation and negatively associated with introjected regulation among people with prediabetes. The same study found perceived competence and relatedness to be positively associated with identified regulation and negatively associated with introjected regulation. In more concrete wording, individuals who experience support from friends or family and who feel competent in maintaining a healthy diet are more likely to become motivated by their own values, such as having good health. Motivation linked to pressure from others or feelings of guilt or shame is negatively associated with maintaining a healthy diet.

== Motivational interviewing ==
Motivational interviewing (MI) is a popular approach to positive behavioral change. Used initially in the area of addiction (Miller & Rollnick, 2002), it is now used for a wider range of issues. It is a client-centered method that does not persuade or coerce patients to change and instead attempts to explore and resolve their ambivalent feelings, which allows them to choose themselves whether to change or not.

Markland, Ryan, Tobin, and Rollnick believe that SDT provides a framework behind how and the reasons why MI works. They believe that MI provides an autonomy-supportive atmosphere, which allows clients to find their own source of motivation and achieve their own success (in terms of overcoming addiction). Patients randomly assigned to an MI treatment group found the setting to be more autonomy-supportive than those in a regular support group.

== Environmental behaviors ==
Several studies explored the link between SDT and environmental behaviors to determine the role of intrinsic motivation for environmental behavior performance and to account for the lack of success of current intervention strategies.

== Consumer behavior ==
Self-determination theory identifies a basic psychological need for autonomy as a central feature for understanding effective self-regulation and well-being. As adopting these services increases both individual and collective well-being, research has to delve more deeply into the origins of consumers' motivations. For this reason aim at augmenting the understanding of how different types of motivation determine consumers' intention to adopt transformative services. They examine whether Self-Determination Theory (SDT) can be of help in fostering more sustainable food choices by taking a closer look at the relationship between food-related types of motivation and different aspects of meat consumption, based on a survey among 1083 consumers in the Netherlands.

=== Motivation toward the environment scale ===
Environmental attitudes and knowledge are not good predictors of behavior. SDT suggests that motivation can predict behavior performance. Pelletier et al. (1998) constructed a scale of motivation for environmental behavior, which consists of 4x6 statements (4 statements for each type of motivation on the SDT motivation scale: intrinsic, integrated, identified, introjected, external, and amotivation) responding to a question 'Why are you doing things for the environment?'. Each item is scored on a 1–7 Likert scale. Utilizing MTES, Villacorta (2003) demonstrates a correlation between environmental concerns and intrinsic motivations together with peer and parental support; further, intrinsically motivated behaviors tend to persist longer.

=== Environmental motivation ===
Pelletier et al. (1999) shows that four personal beliefs: helplessness, strategy, capacity, and effort, lead to greater amotivation, while self-determination has an inverse relationship with amotivation. The Amotivation toward the Environment Scale measures the four reasons for amotivation by answering the question 'Why are you not doing things for the environment?'. The participants rank 16 total statements (four in each category of amotivation) on a 1–7 Likert scale.

=== Intervention strategies ===
Intervention strategies have to be effective in bridging the gap between attitudes and behaviors. Monetary incentives, persuasive communication, and convenience are often successful in the short term, but when the intervention is removed, behavior is discontinued. In the long run, such intervention strategies are therefore expensive and difficult to maintain.

SDT explains that environmental behavior that is not motivated intrinsically is not persistent. On the other hand, when self-determination is high, behavior is more likely to occur repeatedly. The importance of intrinsic motivation is particularly apparent with more difficult behaviors. While they are less likely to be performed in general, people with high internal motivation are more likely to perform them more frequently than people with low intrinsic motivation. 5 Subjects scoring high on intrinsic motivation and supporting ecological well-being also reported a high level of happiness.

According to Osbaldiston and Sheldon (2003), autonomy perceived by an individual leads to an increased frequency of environmental behavior performance. In their study, 162 university students chose an environmental goal and performed it for a week. Perceived autonomy, success in performing chosen behavior, and their future intention to continue were measured. The results suggested that people with higher degree of self-perceived autonomy successfully perform behaviors and are more likely to do so in the long term.

Based on the connection between SDT and environmental behaviors, Pelletier et al. suggest that successful intervention should emphasize self-determined motivation for performing environmental behaviors.

== Industrial and organizational psychology ==
SDT has been applied to industrial and organizational psychology.

== Criticism ==
Despite extensive research, SDT theory also has its critics. Steven Reiss (2017) points to, among others, the lack of a clear definition of intrinsic and extrinsic motivation, unreliability of measurement, inadequately designed experiments, and other factors.

== See also ==
- Digital self-determination
- Industrial and organizational psychology
- Positive psychology

== Additional Resources ==
- Rochester Psychology: SDT
