= Edward L. Deci =

American psychologist and academic (1942–2026)

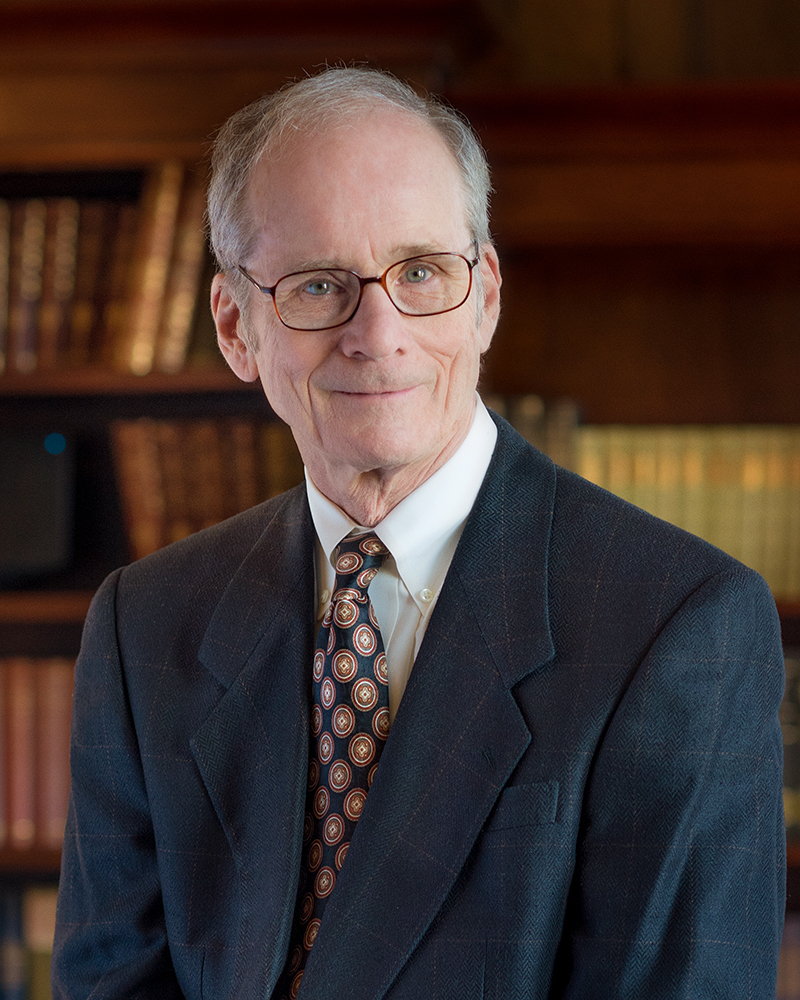
- Born: October 14, 1942; Palmyra, New York, U.S.
- Died: February 14, 2026 (aged 83); Rochester, New York, U.S.
- Education: Carnegie-Mellon University (PhD); University of Pennsylvania (MBA); Hamilton College (AB)
- Occupations: Academic; author; psychologist
- Writing career
- Genres: Motivation, Psychology, Education, Business

Edward Lewis Deci (/ˈdiːsi/; (October 14, 1942 – February 14, 2026) was an American academic and psychologist who was Professor of Psychology and Gowen Professor in the Social Sciences at the University of Rochester, and director of its Human Motivation Program. He was well known in psychology for his theories of intrinsic and extrinsic motivation and basic psychological needs which he had been researching for 40 years. With Richard Ryan, he was the co-founder of self-determination theory (SDT), an influential contemporary motivational theory.

Deci was also president and director of the Monhegan Museum in Monhegan, Maine.

== Early life and education ==
Edward Lenris Deci was born in Palmyra, New York, on October 14, 1942. He attended Hamilton College in Clinton, New York. Deci graduated in 1964 with a degree in mathematics. He then studied at the Wharton School of the University of Pennsylvania and earned his Master of Business Administration from there in 1967.

He went on to earn his PhD from Carnegie Mellon University in social psychology in 1970. In his dissertation, he explored intrinsic motivation and the way social-contextual factors may have an effect on motivation.

== Self-determination theory ==
Self-determination theory is a macro theory of human motivation that differentiates between autonomous and controlled forms of motivation; the theory has been applied to predict behavior and inform behavior change in many contexts including: education, health care, work organizations, parenting, and sport (as well as many others).

== Death ==
Deci died of complications from dementia in Rochester, New York, on February 14, 2026, at the age of 83.

== Publications ==
=== Books ===
- Deci, E. L. (1996). Why we do what we do: Understanding self-motivation. New York: Penguin.
- Deci, E. L., & Ryan, R. M. (2002). Handbook of self-determination research. Rochester, NY: University of Rochester Press.

== Selected works ==
- Deci, E.L. (1975). Intrinsic motivation. New York: Plenum Publishing Co. Japanese Edition, Tokyo: Seishin Shobo, 1980.
- Deci, E.L. (1980). The psychology of self-determination. Lexington, MA: D. C. Heath (Lexington Books). Japanese Edition, Tokyo: Seishin Shobo, 1985.
- Deci, Edward L.; Ryan, Richard M. (1985). Intrinsic motivation and self-determination in human behavior. New York: Plenum. ISBN 0-306-42022-8.
- Deci, E. L., & Ryan, R. M. (2000). "The 'what' and 'why' of goal pursuits: Human needs and the self-determination of behavior." Psychological Inquiry, 11, 227-268.
- Ryan, R. M., & Deci, E. L. (2000). "Self-determination theory and the facilitation of intrinsic motivation, social development, and well-being." American Psychologist, 55, 68-78.
- Deci, Edward L.; Flaste, Richard (1996). Why We Do What We Do: Understanding Self-Motivation. Penguin. ISBN 0-14-025526-5
- Deci, Edward L. (2006). Ryan, Richard M. (ed.). The Handbook of Self-Determination Research. University of Rochester Press. ISBN 1-58046-156-5
- Ryan, R. M., & Deci, E. L. (2017). Self-determination theory: Basic psychological needs in motivation, development, and wellness. New York: Guilford Publishing. ISBN 978-1-4625-2876-9.

== See also ==
- Self-determination theory
- Organismic theory
- Overjustification effect
- Motivation
