= Travel incentive =

Travel incentives are a reward subset of an incentive program, recognition program or a loyalty program, which is a business tool designed to change consumer behavior to improve profit, cash flow, employee engagement and customer engagement. It has been described as business travel that is designed to motivate or trigger action, as a reward for these actions from employees or business partners. This fosters loyalty and encourages the best talent for an organisation.

When an organization properly designs an incentive program, which includes looking at all departments which will be affected, rather than just the impact to the department that is sponsoring the incentive, the return on investment can be proven. Oxford Economics USA wrote in a 2009 study that incentive travel investments yielded a return of investment of more than $4:$1. And stated that in order to achieve the same effect of incentive travel, an employee’s total base compensation would need to be increased by 8.5%.

The Incentive Research Foundation released a study in 2010 following the steps that an organization took to ensure that they received a return on their investment; they successfully merged acquired organizations into their company, and successfully merged their incentive programs.

== Economic impact ==
Incentive trips, meetings and events account for 15% of all travel spending, which creates 2.4 million jobs, $240 billion in spending and $39 billion in tax revenue, according to the U.S. Travel Association. Incentive travel generates about $13 billion a year, according to the Incentive Research Foundation.

The economic impact and the AIG effect had negatively affected incentive travel programs in 2010, with spending on incentive travel being reduced.

== See also ==
- Environmental impact of aviation
- Hypermobility (travel)
- Incentive program
- Loyalty marketing
- Loyalty program
