= Research and Development Tax Incentive =

The Research and Development Tax Incentive (R&D) is a government programme that aims to stimulate Australian investment in R&D. It has been in place since 1 July 2011 and replaced the R&D Tax Concession. The tax incentive reduces company R&D costs by offering tax offsets for eligible R&D expenditure. The tax incentive is jointly administered by Industry Innovation and Science Australia (IISA) and the Australian Taxation Office (ATO).

== History ==
Reforms were announced in the 2020-21 budget. The Treasury Laws Amendment (A Tax Plan for the COVID-19 Economic Recovery) Act 2020 passed the Parliament on 9 October 2020, and received Royal Assent on 14 October 2020. The reforms are to apply to income years beginning on or after 1 July 2021. These reforms supersede the Treasury Laws Amendment Bill 2019.

== Overview ==
The Research and Development (R&D) Tax Incentive aims to stimulate Australian investment in R&D. The incentive reduces R&D costs through tax offsets for eligible expenditure. Proposed changes include a tiered system based on R&D spending for businesses with an aggregated turnover of $20 million or more and a reduced R&D Tax Incentive rate of 43.5% for businesses with an aggregated turnover of less than $20 million.

The R&D Tax Incentive is managed jointly by the Australian Tax Office and the Department of Industry Innovation and Science Australia.

== Application Process ==
=== How to claim ===
Companies can apply to register eligible R&D within 10 months of the end of the company's income year. This registration is supplied to the Department of Industry, Science, Energy and Resources. The tax offset is applied when the Company Income Tax Return is lodged with the Australian Taxation Office. Each income year a company wishes to claim for requires a separate registration.

The R&D Tax Incentive is a self-assessed program. Relevant legislation to determine this is the Industry Research and Development Act 1986, and the Income Tax Assessment Act 1997.

=== Eligibility criteria ===
The R&D tax incentive is available to companies who are:

- Incorporated under Australian law
- Incorporated under foreign law but an Australian resident for income purposes
- Incorporated under foreign law and a resident of a country with which Australia has a double tax agreement

Eligibility for the R&D Tax Incentive requires the following:

- Exist as a company liable to pay income tax in Australia
- Eligible R&D expenditure over $20,000
- Have conducted at least one core R&D activity (as defined under section 355-25 of the Income Tax Assessment Act 1997)

Contemporaneous records must be kept to show that the activities claimed meet the eligibility criteria.

=== Calculation ===
==== Eligible expenses ====
- Expenditure incurred on R&D activities e.g. salaries, contractor charges, non-capital material costs, travel costs or apportioned overhead expenditure such as rent or utilities;
- Decline in value of depreciating assets utilized in R&D activities;
- Balancing adjustments for depreciating assets utilized solely in R&D activities;
- Expenditure related to goods and materials transformed or processed during R&D activities to produce marketable products;
- Monetary contributions under the Cooperative Research Centres program.

These expenditures apply to the eligibility to a notional R&D deduction to the extent that:

- The expenditure is of a kind eligible for the R&D tax incentive;
- The expenditure is incurred during the income year.

==== Non-eligible expenses ====
- Interest expenditure;
- Core technology expenditure;
- Expenditure included in the cost of a depreciating asset or to acquire or construct a building;
- Marketing and advertising costs;
- Bad debts;
- Donations;
- Entertainment;
- Legal expenses not associated with an approved research project;
- Director's fees.

=== Credit calculation ===
Companies with an aggregated turnover below $20 million are eligible for a refundable tax offset of 43.5% and those with a turnover above $20 million for a non-refundable tax offset of 38.5%. The amount that can be claimed under the R&D tax incentive is calculated by multiplying the total notional deductions figure by 43.5% or 38.5%, depending on the type of R&D tax offset that can be claimed. This figure can then be claimed as a tax offset in the company's tax return. If the notional R&D deductions exceed $100 million, the portion exceeding $100 million is offset at the company tax rate.

When keeping records of R&D activities, the expenditure must be apportioned in a reasonable manner with the information available. There are multiple ways in which expenditure can be apportioned and the company's accounting methods and type of expenditure will influence the method that is most appropriate to use. If expenses can be traced to R&D activities accurately as the activities are undertaken, apportionment is not necessary. If this is not possible, apportionment is determined based on the type of activity being conducted, how they are being conducted and the type of expenditure incurred. Some examples of apportionment methodologies include:

- Apportionment based on time spent by employees of R&D activities over total company employee hours for expenses such as electricity and decline in the value of R&D assets
- Apportionment on a basis that reflects the area of use on R&D activities for expenses such as rates, land taxes, rent and lease costs

== Tax rates on R&D ==
An OECD working paper on actual corporate research and development (R&D) tax rates, published on July 29, 2021, reports that the actual average tax rate on R&D investments in Ireland, Lithuania and Hungary ranges from -2% to -4%, suggesting subsidies in the form of tax credits for certain R&D investments in these countries.

The average actual tax rate for R&D investment among the surveyed countries that offered tax incentives was 12.5%, but the rates ranged from a maximum of 25.92% to a minimum of 3.75%. The highest actual average tax rates for R&D investment among the countries studied were in Australia, Mexico and South Korea. The results show that in OECD countries, on average, R&D tax credits reduce firms' actual average tax rate by 8.8 percentage points. The largest reduction in the actual average tax rate for R&D investment was granted in the Slovak Republic, by 19.4%, followed by Thailand and France. The lowest benefits were provided in Denmark and Israel. Among the 48 countries examined, eight offered no R&D tax incentives in the year under study: Argentina, Bulgaria, Cyprus, Estonia, Finland, Germany, Latvia, Luxembourg and Switzerland.

Under the program, taxpayers are required to self-assess each of their activities as primary or ancillary and provide up-to-date documentation to support that assessment.

The OECD report on corporate tax statistics, released in conjunction with the R&D working paper, notes that in recent years there has been a shift towards greater use of R&D tax credits than direct financial support - from 2006 to 2018, tax credits increased from 36% to 56% of total support offered.

== Government Working Group ==
Australia's top tier public policy group on the R&D Tax Incentive is the RDTI roundtable. Core members include, Department of Industry, Innovation and Science, ATO, Deloitte, EY, KPMG, Swanson Reed, Chartered Accountants Australia and New Zealand, Australian Information Industry Association, Boeing, CSL and BDO.

== See also ==
- Research and Development Tax Credit
- Research & Experimentation Tax Credit
- Scientific Research and Experimental Development Tax Credit Program
