= Incentive program =

Activities to support projects with cash or other goods

An incentive program is a formal scheme used to promote or encourage specific actions or behavior by a specific group of people during a defined period of time. Incentive programs are particularly used in business management to motivate employees and in sales to attract and retain customers. Scientific literature also refers to this concept as pay for performance.

== Types ==
=== Consumer ===
Consumer incentive programs are programs targeting the customers of an organization. According to research from 1990, increases in a company's customer retention rate as low as 5% tended to increase profits by 25%-125%. Consumer programs were becoming more widely used as more companies realized that existing customers cost less to reach, cost less to sell to, were less vulnerable to attacks from the competition, and bought more over the long term.

=== Employee ===
Employee incentive programs are programs used to increase overall employee performance. While employees tend to approve of incentive programs, only 27% of companies have such programs in place. Employee programs are often used to reduce turnover, boost morale and loyalty, improve employee wellness and safety, increase retention, and drive daily employee performance.

=== Sales ===
These programs are primarily used to drive sales, reduce sales costs, increase profitability, develop new territory, and enhance margins. Sales incentive programs have the most direct relationship to outcomes. A sales incentive plan (SIP) is a business tool used to motivate and compensate a sales professional or sales agent to meet goals or metrics over a specific period of time, usually broken into a plan for a fiscal quarter or fiscal year. An SIP is very similar to a commission plan; however, an SIP can incorporate sales metrics other than goods sold (or value of goods sold), which is traditionally how a commission plan is derived. Sales metrics used in an SIP are typically in the form of sales quotas (sometimes referred to as point of sale or POS shipments), new business opportunities and/or management by objectives (MBOs) independent action of the sales professional and are usually used in conjunction with a base salary.

SIPs are used to incent sales professionals where total sales are not a precise measure of sales productivity. This is usually due to the complexity or length of the sales process or where a sale is completed not by an individual but by a team of people, each contributing unique skills to the sales process. SIPs are used to encourage and compensate each member of the sales team as they contribute to the team's ability to sell. It is not uncommon for the members of such teams to be located in different physical locations and for the product introduction to happen in one location and the purchase of such a product to occur in another location.

Dealer incentive programs are used to improve performance for dealer, resellers, channel partners and other types of brokers using sales incentive programs. These programs help companies capture market share, launch new products, reduce cost of sales and provide momentum for new launches by incenting an external party to drive additional sales.

== Reward types ==
Selecting the appropriate rewards is vital to any program's success. The goal in choosing rewards is to select items that will spark the participant's interest or feelings, and support the program's objectives. Effective rewards will both motivate short-term behavior and provide motivation over time. There are several types of rewards.

=== Cash ===
While incentive program participants often state that they prefer cash to non-cash rewards, research has shown that cash is a poor motivator due to its lack of "trophy value." In a recent study conducted by the Center for Concept Development, three of five respondents agree that a cash payment is perceived to be part of an employee's total compensation package and not as part of an incentive program. Additionally, cash is quickly forgotten as many participants tend to spend it on everyday items or use it to pay bills. Given that most people do not generally talk about cash awards, cash programs do little to generate the interest required to create an effective incentive program.

Research shows that pay for performance often gives only short term gains, frequently gives no gains at all, and may give reduced performance.

These are usually the simplest reward websites from the user's perspective, since the reward website will usually display a task and the amount of cashback that will be rewarded for completing the task. Cashback websites are often rewarded for online shopping and there is usually a threshold on when a customer can withdraw their earnings, driving loyalty to the cashback website.

=== Points ===
Points-based incentive programs are a type of program where participants collect and redeem points for rewards. Points programs may be used to incentivize both employees and consumers. Depending on the program type and the organizational objectives, points can be awarded on a number of criteria including positive employee behavior, the demonstration of organizational values, repeat customer purchases, the sale of new products, increased overall sales, or even the use of proper safety precautions. In addition to point awarding, the levels at which points can be redeemed can be customized by the organization. Points programs are a way for organizations to motivate behavior over time while improving the organizations’ overall performance. Loyalty programs are a frequently used points-based incentive program in which customers who exhibit a certain behavior are rewarded with points, reinforcing that behavior.

The reward website will usually only display the reward for performing a task in terms of points. These points can then be converted, for example, into online gift vouchers. Alternatively, for each point collected, or after reaching a points' threshold, customers sometimes receive an entry into a sweepstake. This means that the website only ever gives away a pre-determined prize, regardless of how many points are given away.

=== Shares in the company ===
Share rewards websites operate on a model where customers can become stakeholders in the platform or a related company by simply registering as members. Upon becoming shareholders, users have the opportunity to increase their ownership stake by completing various tasks. These tasks often involve actions such as participating in online shopping, completing surveys, or engaging with promotional content. As customers perform these tasks, they earn rewards in the form of points or shares, which contribute to an increasing equity stake in the website or its parent company.

This type of system blends traditional customer loyalty programs with elements of equity participation, providing users not only with immediate rewards but also with long-term potential benefits tied to the company's performance. By incentivizing active participation in the platform, these websites promote user engagement while aligning customer interests with the business's growth. Customers benefit from both the rewards earned for their actions and the potential appreciation of their shares, fostering a deeper connection to the platform and encouraging repeat interactions.

In this way, share rewards websites create an ecosystem where customers become part-owners with a vested interest in the success of the business.

=== Non-cash rewards ===
Merchandise and other non-cash rewards are more often perceived as separate from compensation. Accordingly, non-cash rewards tend to stand out as rewards for performance, which enhances their long-term effect. Branded merchandise and other non-cash rewards have high trophy value, bringing greater recognition to the recipient at the time of the award and possessing a long-term lasting effect that can result in increased engagement in the organization's goals.

=== Gift cards/certificates ===
Gift cards/certificates are prepaid retail cards or certificates which are redeemed at a later time at checkout. In general, they are available in two types: (1) cards which carry a major credit card brand, commonly referred to as universal gift cards (UGC), and are redeemable at all merchants accepting the credit card brand; and (2) retailer-specific cards, issued by well-known merchants, redeemable only through the issuing retailer. In the 2005 Incentive Federation Study of Motivation and Incentive Applications, gift cards were ranked as the most frequently used type of corporate reward. Gift cards are also more likely to be used for luxury purchases and can build an emotional bond with the organization.

=== Merchandise ===
Merchandise rewards can range anywhere from small branded key chains to high-end electronics. In a 2005 study conducted by the Center for Concept Development, 73% of respondents agreed that more stimulating, memorable incentive programs can be built around merchandise as opposed to cash rewards.

=== Travel ===
Travel rewards can best be defined as a face-to-face event designed to motivate, either directly or indirectly. In a 2005 study conducted by the Center for Concept Development, 51% of respondents perceived that travel is remembered longer than other incentive rewards.

=== Experiential ===
Experiential rewards provide program participants with an experience. This form of reward gives organizations the ability to offer their employees and customers interesting experiences as incentives. Examples might include a seaplane flight and lunch, a two-hour horse ride on the beach, a day of sailing for two, a chance to meet a star athlete, or the use of a party planner for an occasion of the recipient's choice. Experiential rewards allow participants to share their experiences with others and reinforce the reward and the behavior that led to the giving of the reward.

=== Non-monetary rewards ===
Non-monetary incentives are used to reward participants for highly productive behavior. Non-monetary incentives may include flexible work hours, payroll or premium contributions, access to day care centers, training, health savings or reimbursement accounts, or even paid sabbaticals. If it comes to environmental behavior, often labeling and recognition certificates are used. This may include stickers or T-shirts with banner logos and stationery with a company logo.

== Digital channels ==
Incentive programs gained significant traction online in the early 2000s; by 2006, 43% of companies using incentive programs use the Internet as a channel.

A website which pays people in gifts or cash for completing provided offers and referring other people and frequently use an affiliate model. These sites are typically sponsored by companies in order to advertise their products. The sites are in turn paid for advertising and attracting new clients. By collecting user data that the user submits, companies can target certain areas of clientele and offer products accordingly.

In most cases, incentive sites grant rewards for completing requirements. This usually requires viewing advertisements, signing up for a site, entering a PIN code (through a mobile device), purchasing trial products or full products or completing surveys. This in turn rewards the specified user in cash, points, check, or its equivalent. Alternately, an offer may entail referring website visitors by inviting them to a target site under a referral link (unique to every user). Referrers in turn are either paid for every person they invited or as percentage of resulting revenue.

=== Online referral programs ===
A type of incentive program that uses referral marketing strategies to motivate consumers, employees, partners or affiliates to recommend a company's products or services. Online referral programs were made proven highly successful by Dropbox, Airbnb These programs are powered by referral marketing software which makes them more efficient and scalable than offline referral programs.

One study by the University of Wuppertal found that participation in these programs reduced cancellation rates at a telecom provide from 19% to 7%, thus increasing customer loyalty.

== See also ==
- Incentive – Something that motivates individuals to perform
- Motivation – Inner state causing goal-directed behavior
- Cobra effect – Incentive with unintended results
- Perverse incentive – Incentive with unintended results
- Goal-setting theory – Development of an action plan in order to achieve a goal
- Travel incentive
- Cashback website – Type of reward website
- Loyalty program – Marketing strategy designed to encourage customers to continue to shop at a business
- Advertising Checking Bureau
- Loyalty marketing – Marketing strategy
- Employee development – Improving the effectiveness of organizations and the individuals and teams within them
- Organization development – Study and implementation of techniques that affect organizational change
- Organizational performance – Processes to bring output into alignment with goals
- Share Incentive Plan
