= Incentive payments =

The incentive payments are direct payments made under the National Wool Act (P.L. 83-690, Title VII) to producers of wool and mohair, which were similar to deficiency payments made to producers of grains and cotton. The incentive payment rate was the percentage needed to bring the national average return to producers (the market price plus the incentive payment) up to the annually set national support price. Each producer's direct payment was the payment rate times the market receipts. Producers with higher market receipts got larger support payments. This created an incentive to increase output and to improve quality.

The wool and mohair commodity programs ended after the 1995 marketing year as required by P.L. 103-130. The 2002 farm bill (P.L. 107-171, Sec. 1201) made wool and mohair eligible for marketing assistance loans and loan deficiency payments. For conservation programs, incentive payments refer to cost-sharing payments that producers may receive to attract participation. In some programs, the federal portion of these payments can vary; for these programs, the higher share is provided for the more desirable conservation practices that will provide greater benefits.
