= Incentive trust =

Legally-binding fiduciary relationship

In American estate planning parlance, an incentive trust is a trust designed to encourage or discourage certain behaviors by using distributions of trust income or principal as an incentive. A typical incentive trust might encourage a beneficiary to complete a degree, enter a profession, or abstain from harmful conduct such as substance abuse. The beneficiary might be paid a certain amount of money from the trust upon graduating from college, or the trust might pay a dollar of income from the trust for every dollar the beneficiary earns.

Although incentive trusts have apparently become more common in the early 21st century, a 2007 survey found that less than one-third of wealthy Americans attach conditions to the distribution of their estates. According to Joshua Tate, an assistant professor at SMU Dedman School of Law, incentive trusts pose a problem of inflexibility: "because the settlor cannot foresee all potential eventualities or circumstances and take them into account in the trust, the terms of the trust can prove to be a burden for the beneficiaries." Eileen Gallo, a noted psychotherapist, has argued that, although incentive trusts may be effective in changing behavior, they may in fact be damaging to the beneficiaries, in that they rely on external motivation to encourage activities that should be autotelic in nature. The seeming popularity of incentive trusts, however, is reflected in the many websites created by estate planners to market them.
