= Alyce M. Dickinson =

American organizational psychologist

Alyce M. Dickinson is professor emeritus at Western Michigan University where she taught and researched organizational behavior management for 35 years. Dickinson made early contributions to the field as co-editor of a handbook on organizational behavior management.

== Career ==
Dickinson completed her bachelor of arts degree in psychology at Lycoming College, master's of arts degree in industrial/organizational psychology at Fairleigh Dickinson University, and PhD degree in applied behavior analysis at Western Michigan University. She served on the faculty of Western Michigan for 35 years (1984–2020), and she chaired the Industrial and organizational psychology program for 25 years.

Her primary research areas are reward and incentive systems and organizational systems analysis. In several studies, she looked at the effects of individual and small-group monetary incentives on the performance and satisfaction of employees. Findings suggested that the introduction of feedback had stronger effects on performance than incentives alone.

Dickinson was an advisor to 79 students while at Western Michigan: 60 master's students and 19 PhD students. Many of her students have gone on to lead successful careers in research, universities, and corporate settings. Dickinson served on the editorial boards of the Journal of Organizational Behavior Management, The Behavior Analyst, and the Journal of Applied Behavior Analysis.

== Awards and honors ==
- Organizational Behavior Management Network: Lifetime Achievement Award (2012)
- Organizational Behavior Management Network: Outstanding Contributions Award (1995)
- Association for Behavior Analysis International: Outstanding Mentor Award (2016)
- Western Michigan University's Alumni Association: Teaching Excellence Award (2000)
- American Psychological Association, Division 25: Fellow

== Selected works ==
- Dickinson, A. M. (2005). Are we motivated by money? Some results from the laboratory. Performance Improvement, 44(2), 18–24. https://doi.org/10.1002/pfi.4140440306
- Dickinson, A. M. (2000). The historical roots of organizational behavior management in the private sector: The 1950s–1980s. Journal of Organizational Behavior Management, 20(3/4), 9–58. https://doi.org/10.1300/J075v20n03_02
- Johnson, D., & Dickinson, A. M. (2010). Employee of the month programs: Do they really work? Journal of Organizational Behavior Management, 30(4), 308–32. http://dx.doi.org/10.1080/01608061.2010.520144
- Slowiak, J., M., Dickinson, & A. M., Huitema, B. (2011). Self-solicited feedback: Effects of hourly pay and individual monetary incentive pay. Journal of Organizational Behavior Management, 31(1), 3–20. https://doi.org/10.1080/01608061.2011.541816
