= Laziness =

Disinclination to activity or exertion

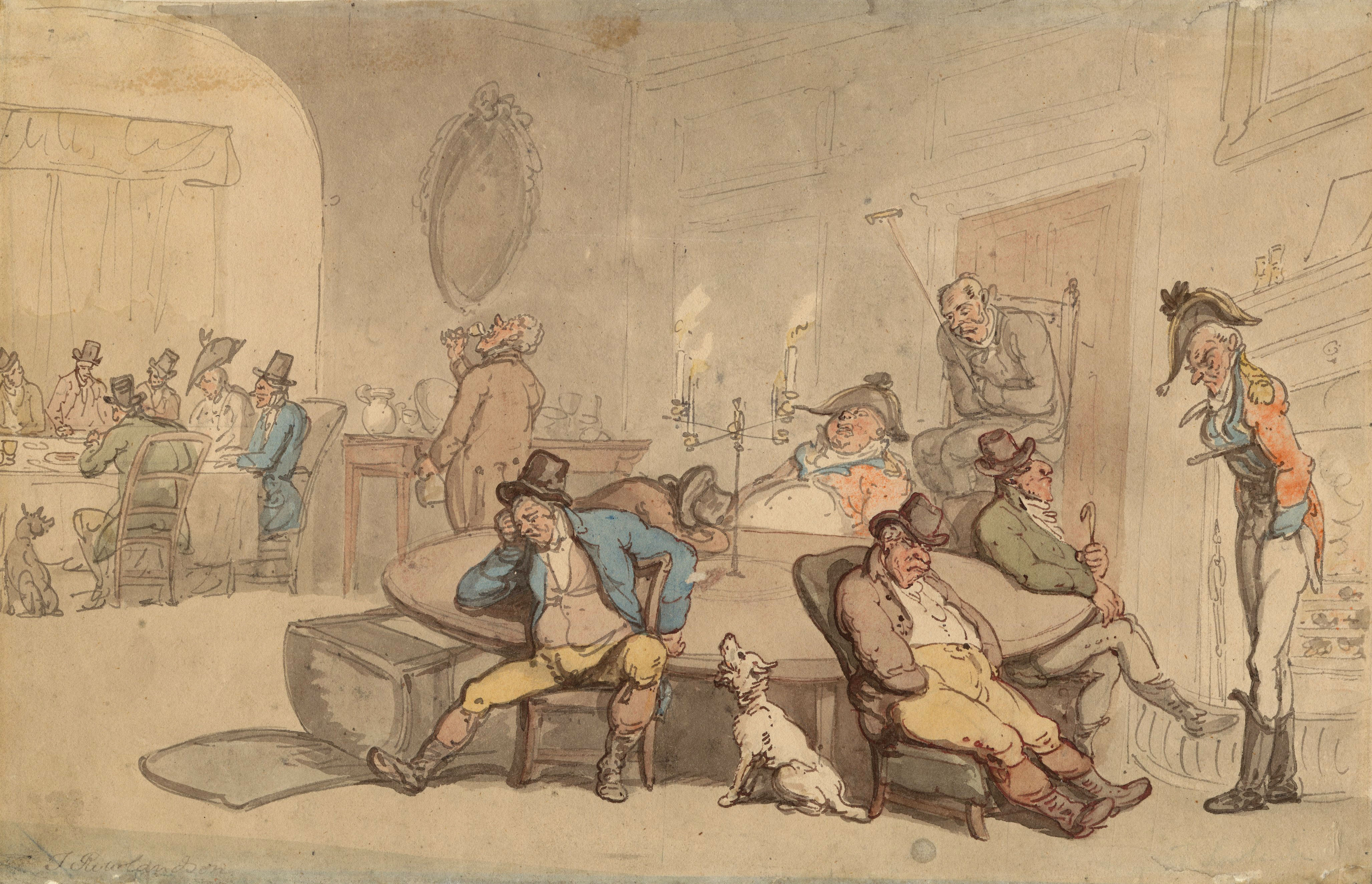
Scene in club lounge, by Thomas Rowlandson

Laziness (also known as indolence or sloth) is emotional disinclination to activity or exertion despite having the ability to act or to exert oneself. It is often used as a pejorative; terms for a person seen to be lazy include "couch potato" and "slacker". Related concepts include sloth, a Christian sin, abulia, a medical term for reduced motivation, and lethargy, a state of lacking energy.

Despite the famed neurologist Sigmund Freud's discussion of the "pleasure principle", Leonard Carmichael noted in 1954 that "laziness" is not a word that appears in the table of contents of most technical books on psychology. A 1931 survey found high-school students more likely to attribute their failing performance to laziness, while teachers ranked "lack of ability" as the major cause, with laziness coming in second. Laziness should not be confused with avolition, a negative symptom of certain mental and neurodevelopmental disorders such as depression, ADHD, ASD, sleep disorders, substance use disorders and schizophrenia.

== Psychology ==
Laziness may reflect a lack of self-esteem, a lack of positive recognition by others, a lack of discipline stemming from low self-confidence, or a lack of interest in the activity or belief in its efficacy. Laziness may manifest as procrastination or vacillation. Studies of motivation suggest that laziness may be caused by a decreased level of motivation, lack of interest, and confidence which in turn can be caused by over-stimulation or excessive impulses or distractions. These increase the release of dopamine, a neurotransmitter responsible for reward and pleasure. The more dopamine that is released, the greater intolerance one has for valuing and accepting productive and rewarding action. This desensitization leads to dulling of the neural patterns and affects negatively the anterior insula of the brain responsible for risk perception.

ADHD specialists say engaging in multiple activities can cause behavioral problems such as attention/focus failure, perfectionism, and pessimism. In these circumstances, laziness can manifest as a negative coping mechanism (aversion), the desire to avoid certain situations to counter certain experiences, and preconceived ill results. Thomas Goetz, University of Konstanz, Germany, and John Eastwood, York University, Canada, concur that aversive states such as laziness can be equally adaptive for making change and toxic if allowed to fester. An outlook found to be helpful in their studies is "being mindful and not looking for ways out of it, simultaneously to be also open to creative and active options if they should arise." They point out that a relentless engaging in activities without breaks can cause oscillations of failure, which may result in mental health issues.

It has also been shown that laziness can render one apathetic to reactant mental health issues such as anger, anxiety, indifference, substance abuse, and depression.

=== Related concepts ===
- Acedia, a state of listlessness.
- Avolition decreases the motivation to initiate and perform self-directed purposeful activities.
- Athymhormia, disorder of motivation.
- Aboulia, neurological, with anatomical damage.
- Amotivational syndrome, normally in the context of heavy cannabis use.
- Procrastination, the delaying of fulfilling tasks.
- Counter-productive work behavior
- Senioritis, the decreased motivation to study which is said to affect those nearing the end of their studies.
- Leisure, which for the Ancient Greeks referred to intellectual cultivation outside of productive labor.

== Economics ==
Economists have differing views of laziness. Frédéric Bastiat argues that idleness is the result of people focusing on the pleasant immediate effects of their actions rather than potentially more positive long-term consequences. Others note that humans seem to have a tendency to seek after leisure. Hal Cranmer writes, "For all these arguments against laziness, it is amazing we work so hard to achieve it. Even those hard-working Puritans were willing to break their backs every day in exchange for an eternity of lying around on a cloud and playing the harp. Every industry is trying to do its part to give its customers more leisure time."

Ludwig von Mises writes, "The expenditure of labor is deemed painful. Not to work is considered a state of affairs more satisfactory than working. Leisure is, other things being equal, preferred to travail (work). People work only when they value the return of labor higher than the decrease in satisfaction brought about by the curtailment of leisure. To work involves disutility."

== Literary ==
Laziness in American literature is highlighted as a fundamental problem with social and spiritual consequences. In 1612 John Smith in his A Map of Virginia is seen using a jeremiad to address idleness. In the 1750s this sort of advocating reached its apex in literature. David Bertelson in The Lazy South (1767) expressed this as a substitution of "spiritual industry" over "patriotic industry". Writers like William Byrd went to a great extent and censured North Carolina as land of lubbers. Thomas Jefferson in his Notes on the State of Virginia (1785) acknowledges a small portion of the people have only seen labor and identifies the cause of this indolence to the rise of "slave-holding" society. Jefferson raised his concerns what this deleterious system will bring to the economic system. Later by the 1800s the rise of Romanticism changed attitudes of the society, values of work were re-written; stigmatization of idleness was overthrown with glamorous notions. John Pendleton Kennedy was a prominent writer in romanticizing sloth and slavery: in Swallow Barn (1832) he equated idleness and its flow as living in oneness with nature. Mark Twain in The Adventures of Huckleberry Finn (1885) contrasts realist and romantic perspective of "laziness" and calls attention to the essential convention of aimlessness and transcendence that connects the character.

In the 20th century the poor whites were portrayed in the grotesque caricatures of early southern laziness. In Flannery O'Connor's Wise Blood (1952) and Good Country People (1955) she depicts spiritual backwardness as the cause for disinclination to work. The lack of any social function which could be valued equally with a luxurious lifestyle was closely portrayed through lives of displaced aristocrats and their indolence. Jason Compson, Robert Penn Warren and William Styron were some of the writers who explored this perspective. The lack of meaningful work was defined as a void which aristocrats needed to fill with pompous culture; Walker Percy is a writer who has thoroughly mined the subject. Percy's characters are often exposed to the emptiness (spiritual sloth) of contemporary life, and come to rectify it with renewed spiritual resources.

== Religion ==
- One of the Catholic seven deadly sins is sloth, which is often defined as spiritual and/or physical apathy or laziness.
- The Arabic term used in the Quran for laziness, inactivity and sluggishness is كَسَل (kasal). The opposite of laziness is Jihad al-Nafs, i.e. the struggle against the self, against one's own ego.
- In Buddhism, the term kausīdya is commonly translated as "laziness" or "spiritual sloth". Kausīdya is defined as clinging to unwholesome activities such as lying down and stretching out, procrastinating, and not being enthusiastic about or engaging in virtuous activity.

== Animals ==
It is common for animals (even those like hummingbirds that have high energy needs) to forage for food until satiated, and then spend most of their time doing nothing, or at least nothing in particular. They seek to "satisfice" their needs rather than obtaining an optimal diet or habitat. Even diurnal animals, which have a limited amount of daylight in which to accomplish their tasks, follow this pattern. Social activity comes in a distant third to eating and resting for foraging animals. When more time must be spent foraging, animals are more likely to sacrifice time spent on aggressive behavior than time spent resting. Extremely efficient predators have more free time and thus often appear more lazy than relatively inept predators that have little free time. Beetles likewise seem to forage lazily due to a lack of foraging competitors. Conversely, some animals, such as pigeons and rats, seem to prefer to respond for food rather than eat equally available "free food" in some conditions.

== See also ==
- Arbeit macht frei
- Critique of work
- Diligence
- Discipline
- Dopamine
- Executive function
- Goldbricking
- Goofing off
- In Praise of Idleness and Other Essays
- Lethargy
- Procrastination
- Psychostimulants
- Temporal discounting
- That Which Is Seen, and That Which Is Not Seen
- The Right to Be Lazy
- Time management
- Underachievement
- Willpower
