= Athymhormia =

Disorder of motivation, curiosity and affect

- Other names: Athymhormic syndrome, athymhormia syndrome, psychic akinesia, auto-activation deficit
- Specialty: Neurology, Psychiatry
- Symptoms: Loss or reduction of desire and interest toward previous motivations, loss of drive and the desire for satisfaction, curiosity, loss of tastes and preferences, flat affect

Athymhormia (from Ancient Greek θυμός thūmós, "mood" or "affect", and hormḗ, "impulse", "drive" or "appetite"), also called athymhormic syndrome, psychic akinesia, or auto-activation deficit (AAD), is a rare psychopathological and neurological syndrome characterized by extreme passivity, apathy, blunted affect and a profound generalized loss of self-motivation and conscious thought. It is a disorder of diminished motivation. Symptoms include the loss or reduction of desire and interest toward previous motivations, loss of drive and the desire for satisfaction, curiosity, the loss of tastes and preferences, and flat affect. In athymhormia, however, these phenomena are not accompanied by the characterizing features of depression nor by any notable abnormality in intellectual or cognitive function.

== Origin ==
The term was invented in 1922 by the French psychiatrists Dide and Guiraud, originally in reference to the behavior identified in some patients with schizophrenia. Another early description is by French neurologist Dominique Laplane in 1982 as "PAP syndrome" (French: perte d'auto-activation psychique, or "loss of psychic autoactivation"). It may occur without any preexisting psychiatric condition.

While athymhormia is discussed in neurological and psychiatric literature, it has not been formally incorporated as a separate diagnostic entity in the DSM-5-TR or in the ICD-11.

== Symptoms ==
It is characterized by an absence of voluntary motion without any apparent motor deficit, and patients often describe a complete mental void or blank. This is accompanied by reduced affect or emotional concern (athymhormy) and often by compulsions, repetitive actions, or tics. After stimulation from the outside, such as a direct command, the patient is able to move normally and carry out complex physical and mental tasks for as long as they are prompted to continue.

The symptoms may be differentiated from depression because depression requires the existence of sadness or negative thoughts, while athymhormic patients claim to have complete lack of thoughts, positive or negative.

== Cause ==
The presence of athymhormic symptoms in patients with damage to these brain structures supports a biological model of motivation. Athymhormia is hypothesized to result from abnormalities in key brain regions involved in motivation and executive function, including the limbic and the frontal cortex, the basal ganglia, and the dorso-medial thalamic nucleus (in a circuit similar to the limbic loop). Specifically, damage to the striatum and globus pallidus—both located within the basal ganglia—is believed to disrupt neural processes responsible for initiating purposeful action and thought.

One theory proposes the existence of a distinct "hormothymic" system, a neural pathway governing mood and interest, with athymhormia representing a disorder of this system.

== See also ==
- Aboulia
- Akinetic mutism
- Amotivational syndrome
- Anhedonia
- Avolition
- Huntington's disease
- Progressive supranuclear palsy
