= Hard heart =

Hard heart may refer to:

- apathy (usually viewed negatively)
- stoicism (usually viewed positively)
