= Asociality =

Lack of motivation to engage in social interaction

Asociality is a lack of motivation to engage in social interaction, or a preference for solitary activities. Asociality may be associated with avolition, but it can, moreover, be a manifestation of limited opportunities for social relationships. Developmental psychologists use the synonyms nonsocial, unsocial, and social uninterest. Asociality is distinct from, but not mutually exclusive to, anti-social behavior. A degree of asociality is routinely observed in introverts, while extreme asociality is observed in people with a variety of clinical conditions.

Asociality is not necessarily perceived as a totally negative trait by society, since asociality has been used as a way to express dissent from prevailing ideas. It is seen as a desirable trait in several mystical and monastic traditions, notably in Hinduism, Jainism, Roman Catholicism, Eastern Orthodoxy, Buddhism, and Sufism.

== Introversion ==
Introversion is "the state of or tendency toward being wholly or predominantly concerned with and interested in one's own mental life." Introverted persons are considered the opposite of extraverts, who seem to thrive in social settings rather than being alone. An introvert may present as an individual preferring being alone or interacting with smaller groups over interaction with larger groups, writing over speaking, having fewer but more fulfilling friendships, and needing time for reflection. While not a measurable personality trait, some popular writers have characterized introverts as people whose energy tends to expand through reflection and dwindle during interaction.

In matters of the brain, researchers have found differences in anatomy between introverted and extraverted persons. Introverted people are found to experience a higher flow of blood to the frontal lobe than extraverts, which is the part of the brain that contributes to problem-solving, memory, and preemptive thought.

== Social anhedonia ==
Social anhedonia is found in both typical and extreme cases of asociality or personality disorders that feature social withdrawal. Social anhedonia is distinct from introversion and is frequently accompanied with alexithymia.

Many cases of social anhedonia are marked by extreme social withdrawal and the complete avoidance of social interaction. One research article studying the individual differences in social anhedonia discusses the negative aspects of this form of extreme or aberrant asociality. Some individuals with social anhedonia are at higher risk of developing schizophrenia and may have mental functioning that becomes poorer than the average.

== In human evolution and anthropology ==
Scientific research suggests that asocial traits in human behavior, personality, and cognition may have several useful evolutionary benefits. Traits of introversion and aloofness can protect an individual from impulsive and dangerous social situations because of reduced impulsivity and reward. Frequent voluntary seclusion stimulates creativity and can give the individual time to think, work, reflect, and see useful patterns more easily.

Research indicates the social and analytical functions of the brain function in a mutually exclusive way. With this in mind, researchers posit that people who devoted less time or interest to socialization used the analytical part of the brain more frequently and thereby were often responsible for devising hunting strategies, creating tools, and spotting useful patterns in the environment in general for both their own safety and the safety of the group.

Imitation and social learning have been confirmed to be potentially limiting and maladaptive in animal and human populations. When social learning overrides personal experience (asocial learning), negative effects can be observed such as the inability to seek or pick the most efficient way to accomplish a task and a resulting inflexibility to changing environments. Individuals who are less receptible, motivated, and interested in sociability are likely less affected by or sensible to socially imitated information and faster to notice and react to changes in the environment, essentially holding onto their own observations in a rigid manner and, consequently, not imitating a maladaptive behavior through social learning. These behaviors, including deficits in imitative behavior, have been observed in individuals with autism spectrum disorders and introverts, and are correlated with the personality traits of neuroticism and disagreeableness.

The benefits of this behavior for the individual and their kin caused it to be preserved in part of the human population. The usefulness for acute senses, novel discoveries, and critical analytical thought may have culminated in the preservation of the suspected genetic factors of autism and introversion itself due to their increased cognitive, sensorial, and analytical awareness.

== In psychopathology ==
=== Schizophrenia ===
In schizophrenia, asociality is one of the main five "negative symptoms", with the others being avolition, anhedonia, reduced affect, and alogia. Due to a lack of desire to form relationships, social withdrawal is common in people with schizophrenia. People with schizophrenia may experience social deficits or dysfunction as a result of the disorder, leading to asocial behavior. Frequent or ongoing delusions and hallucinations can deteriorate relationships and other social ties, isolating individuals with schizophrenia from reality and in some cases leading to homelessness. Even when treated with medication for the disorder, they may be unable to engage in social behaviors. These behaviors include things like maintaining conversations, accurately perceiving emotions in others, or functioning in crowded settings. There has been extensive research on the effective use of social skills training (SST) for the treatment of schizophrenia, in outpatient clinics as well as inpatient units. SST can be used to help patients with schizophrenia make better eye contact with other people, increase assertiveness, and improve their general conversational skills.

=== Personality disorders ===
==== Avoidant personality disorder ====
Asociality is common amongst people with avoidant personality disorder (AvPD). They experience discomfort and feel inhibited in social situations, being overwhelmed by feelings of inadequacy. Such people remain consistently fearful of social rejection, choosing to avoid social engagements as they do not want to give people the opportunity to reject (or possibly, accept) them. Though they inherently crave a sense of belonging, their fear of criticism and rejection leads people with AvPD to actively avoid occasions that require social interaction, leading to extremely asocial tendencies; as a result, these individuals often have difficulty cultivating and preserving close relationships.

People with AvPD may also display social phobia, the difference being that social phobia is the fear of social circumstances whereas AvPD is better described as an aversion to intimacy in relationships.

==== Schizoid personality disorder ====
Schizoid personality disorder (SzPD) is characterized by a lack of interest in social relationships, a tendency towards a solitary lifestyle, secretiveness, emotional coldness, and apathy. Affected individuals may simultaneously demonstrate a rich and elaborate but exclusively internal fantasy world.

It is not the same as schizophrenia, although they share such similar characteristics as detachment and blunted affect. There is, moreover, increased prevalence of the disorder in families with schizophrenia.

==== Schizotypal personality disorder ====
Schizotypal personality disorder is characterized by a need for social isolation, anxiety in social situations, odd behavior and thinking, and often unconventional beliefs. People with this disorder feel extreme discomfort with maintaining close relationships with people, and therefore they often do not. People who have this disorder may display peculiar manners of talking and dressing and often have difficulty in forming relationships. In some cases, they may react oddly in conversations, not respond, or talk to themselves.

=== Autism ===
In non-autistic settings, autistic people may display asocial tendencies. This is due to differences in how autistic and non-autistic people communicate. These different communication styles can cause mutual friction between the two neurotypes, known as the double empathy problem. Autistic people tend to express emotions differently and less intensely than non-autistic people, and often do not pick up on non-autistic social cues or linguistic pragmatics (including eye contact, facial expressions, tone of voice, body language, and implicatures) used to convey emotions and hints.

Connecting with others is important to overall health. An increased difficulty in accurately reading social cues by others can affect this desire for people with autism. The risk of adverse social experiences is high for those with autism, and so they may prefer to be avoidant in social situations rather than experience anxiety over social performance. Social deficits in people with autism is directly correlated with the increased prevalence of social anxiety in this community. As they are in a steep minority, there is risk of not having access to like-minded peers in their community, which can lead them to withdrawal and social isolation.

=== Mood disorders ===
==== Depression ====
Asociality can be observed in individuals with major depressive disorder or dysthymia, as individuals lose interest in everyday activities and hobbies they used to enjoy, and this may include social activities, resulting in social withdrawal and withdrawal tendencies.

SST can be adapted to the treatment of depression with a focus on assertiveness training. Depressed patients often benefit from learning to set limits with others, to obtain satisfaction for their own needs, and to feel more self-confident in social interactions. Research suggests that patients who are depressed because they tend to withdraw from others can benefit from SST by learning to increase positive social interactions with others instead of withdrawing from social interactions.

=== Social anxiety disorder ===
Asocial behavior is observed in people with social anxiety disorder (SAD), who experience perpetual and irrational fears of humiliating themselves in social situations. They often have panic attacks and severe anxiety as a result, which can occasionally lead to agoraphobia. The disorder is common in children and young adults, diagnosed on average between the ages of 8 and 15. If left untreated, people with SAD exhibit asocial behavior into adulthood, avoiding social interactions and career choices that require interpersonal skills. Social Skills Training can help people with social phobia or shyness to improve their communication and social skills so that they will be able to mingle with others or go to job interviews with greater ease and self-confidence.

=== Traumatic brain injury ===
Traumatic brain injuries (TBI) can also lead to asociality and social withdrawal.

== Management ==
=== Treatments ===
==== Social skills training ====
Social skills training (SST) is a technique aimed towards anyone with "difficulty relating to others," a common symptom of shyness, marital and family conflicts, or developmental disorders; as well as of many mental and neurological disorders including adjustment disorders, alcohol dependence, anxiety disorders, attention-deficit/hyperactivity disorder, autism spectrum disorder, avoidant personality disorder, bipolar disorder, major depressive disorder, obsessive-compulsive disorder, paranoid personality disorder, schizophrenia, schizotypal personality disorder and social anxiety disorder.

Social skills can be learned, as they are not simply inherent to an individual's personality or disposition. Therefore, it is possible for anyone who wishes to improve their social skills, including those with psychosocial or neurological disorders. Nonetheless, asociality may still be considered neither a character flaw nor an inherently negative trait.

SST includes improving eye contact, speech duration, frequency of requests, and the use of gestures, as well as decreasing automatic compliance to the requests of others. SST has been shown to improve levels of assertiveness (positive and negative) in both men and women.

Additionally, SST can focus on receiving skills (e.g. accurately perceiving problem situations), processing skills (e.g. considering several response alternatives), and sending skills (delivering appropriate verbal and non-verbal responses).

==== Metacognitive interpersonal therapy ====
Metacognitive interpersonal therapy is a method of treating and improving the social skills of people with personality disorders that are associated with asociality. Through metacognitive interpersonal therapy, clinicians seek to improve their patients' metacognition, meaning the ability to recognize and read the mental states of themselves. The therapy differs from SST in that the patient is trained to identify their own thoughts and feelings as a means of recognizing similar emotions in others. Metacognitive interpersonal therapy has been shown to improve interpersonal and decision-making skills by encouraging awareness of suppressed inner states, which enables patients to better relate to other people in social environments.

The therapy is often used to treat patients with two or more co-occurring personality disorders, commonly including obsessive-compulsive and avoidant behaviors.

=== Coping mechanisms ===
In order to cope with asocial behavior, many individuals, especially those with avoidant personality disorder, develop an inner world of fantasy and imagination to entertain themselves when feeling rejected by peers. Asocial people may frequently imagine themselves in situations where they are accepted by others or have succeeded at an activity. Additionally, they may have fantasies relating to memories of early childhood and close family members.

== See also ==
- Anti-social behaviour
- Black triangle (badge)
- Conformity
- Disorders of diminished motivation
- Dissent
- Hermit
- Hikikomori
- Introspection
- Extraversion and introversion § Introversion
- Recluse
- Seclusion
- Silent treatment
- Social isolation
- Solitude
