= Amotivational syndrome =

Impairments primarily associated with cannabis use

- Specialty: Psychiatry

Amotivational syndrome is a chronic psychiatric disorder characterized by cognitive and emotional states such as detachment, blunted emotions and drives, deficits in executive functions like working memory and attention, disinterest, passivity, apathy, and a general lack of motivation. It is divided into two subtypes: marijuana amotivational syndrome (or cannabis-induced amotivational syndrome), caused by usage or dependency on that substance and is primarily associated with the long-term effects of cannabis use, and SSRI-induced amotivational syndrome (or SSRI-induced apathy), caused by the intake of selective serotonin reuptake inhibitors (SSRIs). According to the Handbook of Clinical Psychopharmacology for Therapists, amotivational syndrome is a possible side effect of SSRI treatment of clinical depression. It is a disorder of diminished motivation.

== Signs and symptoms ==
Amotivational syndrome has been suspected to affect the frontal cortex or frontal lobe of the brain by the impairment of that region which monitors cognitive functions and skills that revolve around emotional expression, decision making, prioritisation, and internal, purposeful mental action. It is most often detected through signs that are linked to apathy such as disinhibited presentations, short and long term memory deficit or amnesia, a lack of emotional display also known as emotional blunting, relative disinterest, passivity, and reluctance to participate in prolonged activities that require attention or tenacity.

Common symptoms that may also be experienced include incoherence, an inability to concentrate on tasks, emotional distress, a diminished level of consciousness, selective attention or attentional control, and being withdrawn and asocial. These symptoms are also generally linked to cannabis consumption and abuse, as well as SSRI medication that are often used as forms of antidepressant medication.

== Subtypes ==
=== Cannabis amotivational syndrome ===
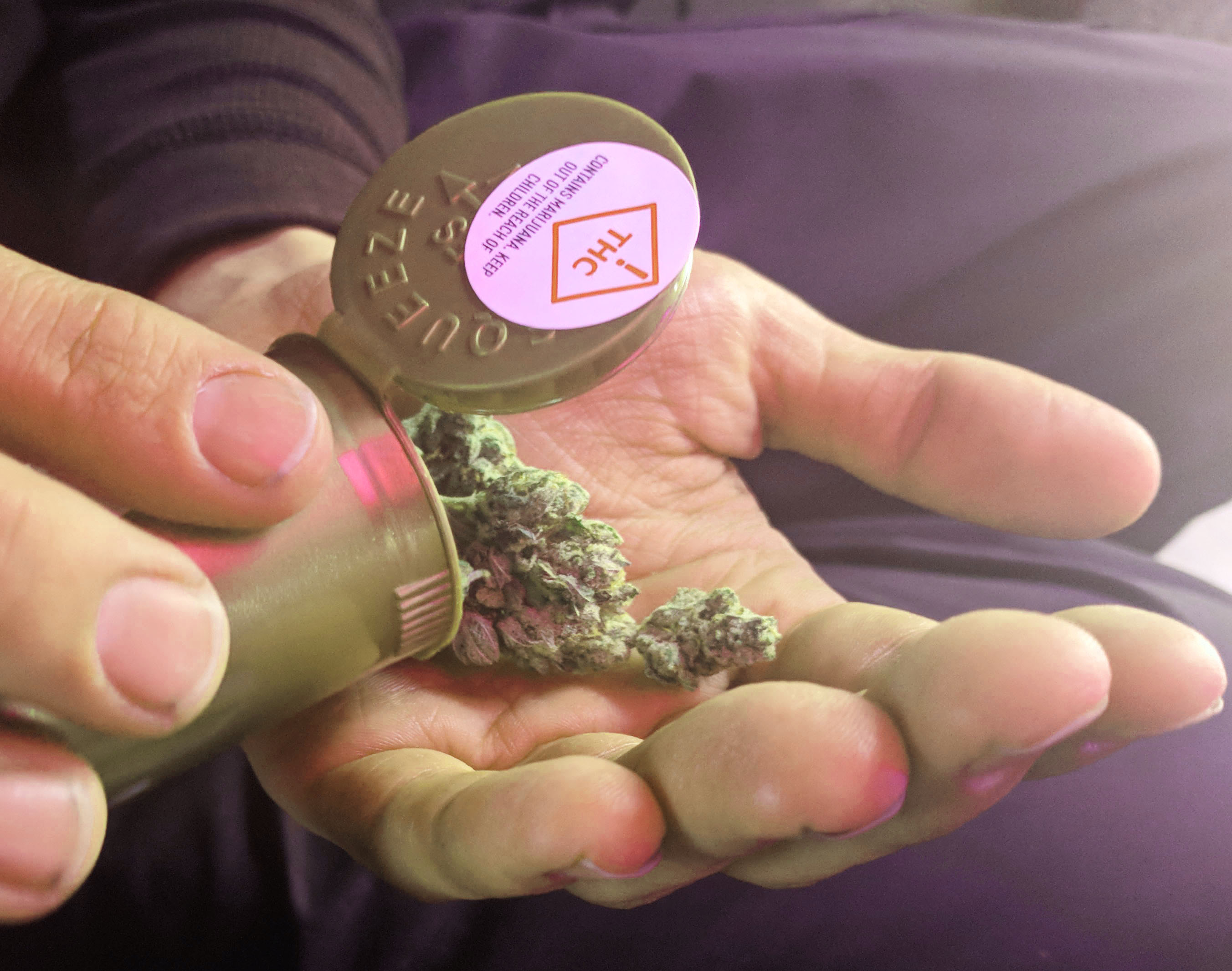
Legal cannabis (marijuana) product. Overconsumption and reliance could lead to cannabis-induced amotivational syndrome.

The term amotivational syndrome was first devised to understand and explain the diminished drive and desire to work or compete among the population of youth who are frequent consumers of cannabis and has since been researched through various methodological studies. Cannabis related amotivational syndrome is closely tied with cannabis use disorder which is recognized in the fifth version of the Diagnostic and Statistical Manual of Mental Disorders (DSM-5) and has similar conditions such as withdrawing and giving up from daily activities and neglecting major roles and responsibilities.

It is characterized by a gradual detachment and disconnect from the outer world due to a loss of emotional reactivity, drives, and aims. Responsiveness to any stimuli is limited, and those affected are unable to experience or anticipate any pleasure except through the use of cannabis.

Cannabis amotivational syndrome has been looked at within the context of how motivation-related constructs influence the young adult in the context of the school or workplace. Those affected have poor levels of school-related functioning, are unable to focus on schoolwork due to their lack of motivation, are less satisfied with participating in educational activities, and easily enter into conflict with scholastic authorities.

Marijuana amotivational syndrome is closely linked to self-efficacy, a psychological concept which encapsulates how one values their capabilities and the amount of confidence they hold in their capabilities to persevere - this is related to motivation as people who hold a high amount of self-efficacy are more likely to make efforts to complete a task and persist longer in those efforts compared to those with lower self-efficacy.

=== SSRI-induced amotivational syndrome ===
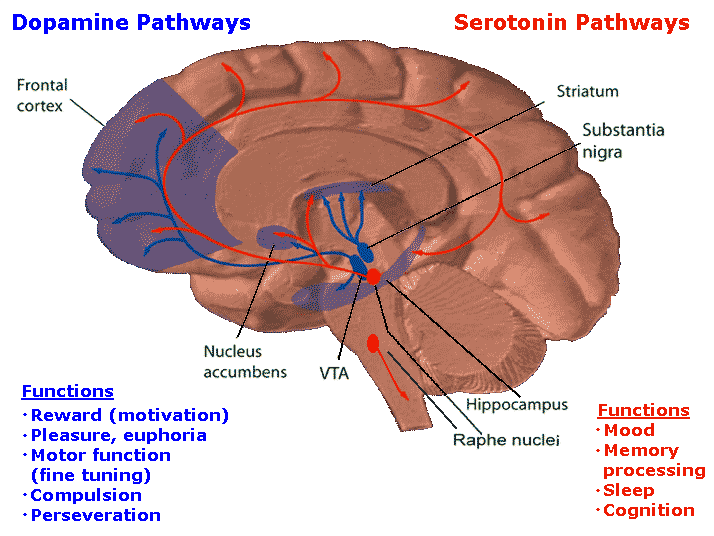
Dopamine-Serotonin system that explains brain activity in relation to serotonergic pathways

Amotivational syndrome caused or related to SSRI dosage is also commonly known as apathy syndrome, SSRI-induced apathy syndrome, SSRI-induced apathy, and antidepressant apathy syndrome. This syndrome is linked to the consumption and dosage of selective serotonin reuptake inhibitors (SSRIs), which are typically used as antidepressants, and has been reported in patients undergoing SSRI treatment.

SSRIs may modulate and alter the activity occurring in the frontal lobe of the brain, one of the four major lobes in the brain that contains most of the dopaminergic pathways that are associated with reward, attention, short-term memory tasks, planning, and motivation. This syndrome may be related to serotonergic effects on the frontal lobes and/or serotonergic modulation of mid-brain dopaminergic systems which project to the prefrontal cortex, both suggesting the possibility of frontal lobe dysfunction due to the alteration of serotonin levels.

This brings on a number of similar symptoms that lead to dose dependency and apathy, however, it has often been unrecognized and undiagnosed due to the lack of prevalent data and its subtle and delayed onset. When looking at SSRI-induced amotivational syndrome as a clinical side effect, it can be looked at through a behavioural perspective as well as an emotional perspective. When looked at as a behavioural syndrome the association between apathy or low motivation and SSRI prescription has been recognized as a potential side effect, for example, behavioural apathy has been noted in several case reports. An emotional perspective emphasizes the emotional aspects of indifference such as a lack of emotional responsiveness, a reduction in emotional sensitivity such as numbing or blunting emotion. Affected patients often describe having a restricted range of emotions including those emotions that are a part of everyday life, and distinct emotional themes that include a general reduction in the intensity or experience of all emotions, both positive and negative, and feeling emotionally detached and "just not caring", diminishing emotionality in both personal and professional interpersonal relationships.

== Treatment and evaluation ==
=== Cannabis amotivational syndrome ===
Treatment of cannabis amotivational syndrome is like the treatment for cannabis dependence. There should be careful evaluation for any signs of depression that predate the development of the amotivational syndrome and may be the basis for cannabis dependence and usage. The user is slowly weaned off usage through urine monitoring, self-help groups, education, and therapy in different treatment settings such as group, family, and individual therapy in order to separate themselves from cannabis consumption and any cannabis-related environment as both contribute to the cognitive aspects of amotivational syndrome.

=== SSRI-induced amotivational syndrome ===
Treatments include gradually reducing or discontinuing the SSRI, changing the SSRI to another antidepressant class, or co-prescribing with the SSRI a medication that boosts dopamine, such as the antidepressant bupropion.

== Current research and discourse ==
=== Cannabis amotivational syndrome ===
Though there is a prevalent relationship between cannabis consumption and amotivational syndrome, there is still some considerable debate that exists around cannabis consumption causing amotivational syndrome. It may not be a single entity but rather a collection of behaviors that form the result of a combination of effects of an already existent or reactive depression that occurs alongside cannabis’s ability to facilitate a unique attention state.

Trait absorption is often mentioned within discourses surrounding cannabis-induced amotivational syndrome and it states that the traits associated with a large majority of marijuana users, which are similar to traits found in those who have amotivational syndrome, such as boredom and a general feeling of disconnect, are absorbed and taken up by the cannabis user. It is used as a common argument against cannabis potentially being able to cause amotivational syndrome, instead, many cannabis users have stated that users often absorb what is often thought of as the typical set of traits marijuana consumers possess, which overlap with some of the traits found in amotivational syndrome. As a result, many have proposed that rather than cannabis being thought of as a psychologically harmful substance, it is instead thought of as an active placebo in which its effects on the mind are placebo effects in response to minimal physiological action rather than being a direct cause of the psychological changes seen in users.

Additionally, though research has been conducted, it is recognized that there is not enough substantial empirical research to conclude that the use of cannabis leads to amotivational syndrome. Anecdotal information such as statements taken from cannabis users includes feeling listless and lethargic. Amotivational syndrome still ranks high among the key problems associated with the drug, with researchers having adopted the phrase "amotivational" to describe lethargic cannabis users. The US Department of Health and Human Services also warns that usage in youth may result in amotivational symptoms such as an apathetic approach to life, fatigue, and poor academic and work performance. However, empirical research on the effects of cannabis on users’ motivation implies that there is no strong correlation and that there are numerous alternative explanations of these negative outcomes as a review of laboratory performance research, education data, and employment statistics fail to offer consistent evidence that directly link cannabis to any symptoms associated with amotivational syndrome.

Though several studies contain data in which heavy cannabis users have reported feeling a lack of motivation, it has also been acknowledged that other variables such as comorbid drug use and baselines for low motivation may not be examined. A 2024 study found that cannabis had no effect on motivation. Participants in this study demonstrated "the same willingness to exert effort on tasks while high as when they were not". Cannabis use did however led to "decreased self-regulation, making users more impulsive and less orderly", which could be mistaken for amotivational syndrome.

=== SSRI-induced amotivational syndrome ===
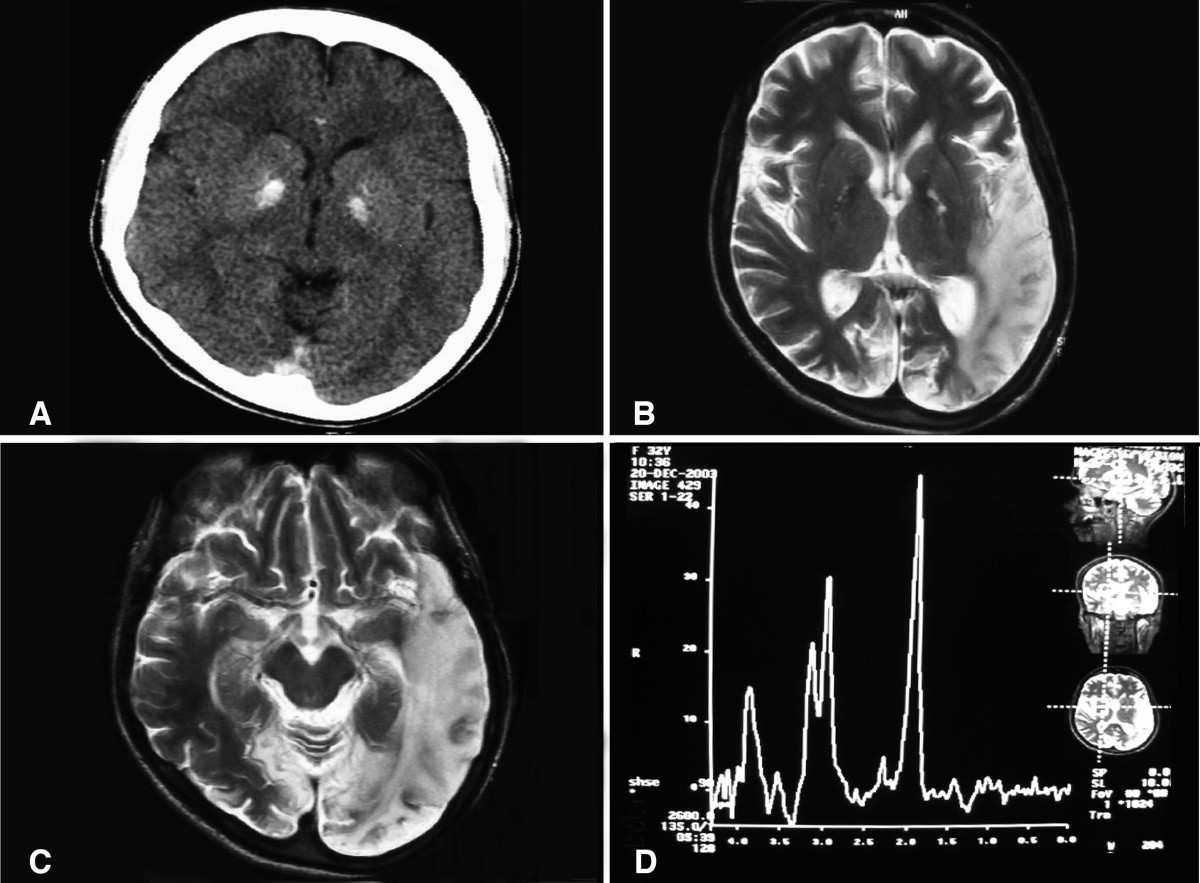
Neuroimaging of lesions in the basal ganglia

Most research in psychological fields regarding amotivational syndrome caused by SSRI treatment has revolved around case studies and anecdotal reports to understand how SSRI medication influences levels of motivation and apathy in patients. There is considerable overlap in the clinical presentations of apathy and amotivation and depression. Many patients with amotivational or apathy syndrome reported that they felt a lack of motivation that was unlike what they had sometimes experienced during previous episodes or depression, or that their feelings of apathy had no link to depression. Apathy syndrome has also been reported in a number of patients that have received or are receiving selective serotonin reuptake inhibitor (SSRI) treatment over the last decade, which has also been linked to a deficit in the performance and activities of daily living, signaling a functional decline. It is a common behavioural problem that often goes undiagnosed and untreated, which is why it is considered to be clinical significant.

Neuropsychological research has shown that a common feature of amotivational syndrome involves the presence of lesions and other abnormalities in the circulation of the frontal lobe. Neuroimaging studies of clinical populations have also reported correlations between apathy and structural and functional changes in the frontal lobe in the anterior cingulate gyrus and subregions of the basal ganglia. Recent case-control studies have also reported that apathy has appeared to be greater in patients who were treated with SSRI medication compared to patients who were not. Current findings are consistent with other findings supporting the correlation of SSRI and apathy due to the occurrence of abnormalities found within various regions of the frontal lobe. Though amotivational syndrome has been an emerging concern for pharmacotherapeutic industries to consider, there is still a growing body of empirical investigations that need to continue in order for the development of novel therapeutic interventions to improve, as well as treatment. Currently, empirical studies are limited and there is not a substantial enough amount of research to fully understand the link between frontal lobe abnormalities caused by SSRIs and thus resulting in amotivational syndrome. There is a lack of large-scale clinical studies that focus on the prevalence of SSRI-induced amotivational syndrome with regards to emotional blunting and apathy in both psychiatric or primary care populations, despite the high prescription rates for SSRI medication.

There are also no current clinically popular scales to measure and assess SSRI-induced apathy. The Oxford Questionnaire of Emotional Side Effects of Antidepressants (OQESA) is a scale under development and presents a 26-item, Likert-style, self-report scale that aims to understand respondents’ emotional experiences such as a general reduction in emotions, a reduction in positive emotions, emotional detachment and blunting, and feelings of not caring. Respondents are also asked to what extent they believe their antidepressant is responsible for these emotional symptoms.

== See also ==
- Avolition
- Effects of cannabis
