= Disorders of diminished motivation =

Group of psychiatric and neurological conditions

Disorders of diminished motivation (DDM) are a group of disorders involving diminished motivation and associated emotions. Many different terms have been used to refer to diminished motivation. Often however, a spectrum is defined encompassing apathy, abulia, and akinetic mutism, with apathy the least severe and akinetic mutism the most extreme.

DDM can be caused by psychiatric disorders like depression and schizophrenia, brain injuries, strokes, and neurodegenerative diseases. Damage to the anterior cingulate cortex and to the striatum, which includes the nucleus accumbens and caudate nucleus and is part of the mesolimbic dopamine reward pathway, have been especially associated with DDM. Diminished motivation can also be induced by certain drugs, including antidopaminergic agents like antipsychotics, selective serotonin reuptake inhibitors (SSRIs), and cannabis, among others.

DDM can be treated with dopaminergic and other activating medications, such as dopamine reuptake inhibitors, dopamine releasing agents, and dopamine receptor agonists, among others. These kinds of drugs have also been used by healthy people to improve motivation. A limitation of some medications used to increase motivation is development of tolerance to their effects.

== Definition ==
Disorders of diminished motivation (DDM) is an umbrella term referring to a group of psychiatric and neurological disorders involving diminished capacity for motivation, will, and affect.

A multitude of terms have been used to refer to DDM of varying severities and varieties, including apathy, abulia, akinetic mutism, athymhormia, avolition, amotivation, anhedonia, psychomotor retardation, affective flattening, akrasia, and psychic akinesia (auto-activation deficit or loss of psychic self-activation), among others. Other constructs, like fatigue, lethargy, and anergia, also overlap with the concept of DDM. Alogia (poverty of speech) and asociality (lack of social interest) are associated with DDM as well.

Often however, a spectrum of DDM is defined encompassing apathy, abulia, and akinetic mutism, with apathy being the mildest form and akinetic mutism being the most severe or extreme form. Akinetic mutism involves alertness but absence of movement and speech due to profound lack of will. People with the condition are indifferent even to biologically relevant stimuli such as pain, hunger, and thirst.

== Causes ==
Less extreme forms of DDM, for instance apathy or anhedonia, can be a symptom of psychiatric disorders and related conditions, like depression, schizophrenia, or drug withdrawal. More extreme forms of DDM, for instance severe apathy, abulia, or akinetic mutism, can be a result of traumatic brain injury (TBI), stroke, or neurodegenerative diseases like dementia or Parkinson's disease.

Reduction in motivation and affect can also be induced by certain drugs, such as dopamine receptor antagonists including D_{2} receptor receptor antagonists like antipsychotics (e.g., haloperidol) and metoclopramide and D_{1} receptor antagonists like ecopipam, dopamine-depleting agents like tetrabenazine and reserpine, dopaminergic neurotoxins like 6-hydroxydopamine (6-OHDA) and methamphetamine, serotonergic antidepressants like the selective serotonin reuptake inhibitors (SSRIs) and MAO-A-inhibiting monoamine oxidase inhibitors (MAOIs), and cannabis or cannabinoids (CB_{1} receptor agonists).

Damage to a variety of brain areas have been implicated in DDM. However, damage to or reduced functioning of the anterior cingulate cortex (ACC) and striatum have been especially implicated in DDM. The striatum is part of the dopaminergic mesolimbic pathway, which connects the ventral tegmental area (VTA) of the midbrain to the nucleus accumbens (NAc) of the ventral striatum and basal ganglia. Strokes affecting other striatal and basal ganglia structures, like the caudate nucleus of the dorsal striatum, have also been associated with DDM.

== Treatment ==
DDM, like abulia and akinetic mutism, can be treated with dopaminergic and other activating medications. These include psychostimulants and releasers or reuptake inhibitors of dopamine and/or norepinephrine like amphetamine, methylphenidate, bupropion, modafinil, and atomoxetine; D_{2}-like dopamine receptor agonists like pramipexole, ropinirole, rotigotine, piribedil, bromocriptine, cabergoline, and pergolide; the dopamine precursor levodopa; and MAO-B-selective monoamine oxidase inhibitors (MAOIs) like selegiline and rasagiline, among others. Selegiline is also a catecholaminergic activity enhancer (CAE), and this may additionally or alternatively be involved in its pro-motivational effects.

The dopamine D_{1} receptor appears to have an important role in motivation and reward. Centrally acting dopamine D_{1}-like receptor agonists like tavapadon and razpipadon and D_{1} receptor positive modulators like mevidalen and glovadalen are under development for medical use, including treatment of Parkinson's disease and notably of dementia-related apathy. Centrally active catechol-O-methyltransferase inhibitors (COMTIs) like tolcapone, which are likewise dopaminergic agents, have been studied in the treatment of psychiatric disorders but not in the treatment of DDM. Genetic variants in catechol-O-methyltransferase (COMT) have been associated with motivation and apathy susceptibility, as well as with reward, mood, and other neuropsychological variables.

Besides in people with DDM, psychostimulants and related agents have been used non-medically to enhance motivation in healthy people, for instance in academic contexts. This has provoked discussions on the ethics of such uses.

A limitation of certain medications used to improve motivation, like psychostimulants, is development of tolerance to their effects. Rapid acute tolerance to amphetamines is believed to be responsible for the dissociation between their relatively short durations of action (~4 hours for main desired effects) and their much longer elimination half-lives (~10 hours) and durations in the body (~2 days). It appears that continually increasing or ascending concentration–time curves are beneficial for prolonging effects, which has resulted in administration multiple times per day and development of delayed- and extended-release formulations. Medication holidays and breaks can be helpful in resetting tolerance.

Another possible limitation of amphetamine specifically is dopaminergic neurotoxicity, which might occur even at therapeutic doses.

Besides medications, various psychological and physiological processes, including arousal, mood, expectancy effects (e.g., placebo), novelty, psychological stress or urgency, rewarding and aversive stimuli, availability of rewards, addiction, and sleep amount, among others, can also context- and/or stimulus-dependently modulate or enhance brain dopamine signaling and motivation to varying degrees. Relatedly, the psychostimulant effects of amphetamine are greatly potentiated by environmental novelty in animals.

== Related concepts ==
Attention deficit hyperactivity disorder (ADHD) often involves motivational deficits, and the ADHD academic Russell Barkley has referred to the condition as a "motivational deficit disorder" in various publications and presentations. However, ADHD has perhaps more accurately been conceptualized as a disorder of executive function and of directing or allocating attention and motivation rather than a global deficiency in these processes. People with ADHD are often highly motivated towards stimuli that interest them, not uncommonly experiencing a flow-like state called hyperfocus while engaging such stimuli. In any case, as with management of DDM, psychostimulants and other catecholaminergic agents are used in people with ADHD to treat their symptoms, including difficulties with attention, executive control, and motivation, and are clinically effective for such purposes. Amphetamines in the treatment of ADHD appear to have among the largest effect sizes in terms of effectiveness of any interventions (medications or forms of psychotherapy) used in the management of psychiatric disorders generally.

DDM (and ADHD) should not be confused with "motivational deficiency disorder" ("MoDeD"; "extreme laziness"), a fake or spoof disease created for humorous purposes in 2006 to raise awareness about disease mongering, overdiagnosis, and medicalization.

== See also ==
- Motivation-enhancing drug
