= Akinetic mutism =

Disorder of diminished motivation

- Specialty: Neurology, Psychiatry

Akinetic mutism is a medical condition in which patients tend to neither move (akinesia) nor speak (mutism). It is the most severe disorder of diminished motivation. Akinetic mutism was first described in 1941 as a mental state where patients lack the ability to move or speak. However, their eyes may follow their observer or be diverted by sound. Patients lack most motor functions such as speech, facial expressions, and gestures, but demonstrate apparent alertness. They exhibit reduced activity and slowness, and can speak in whispered monosyllables. Patients often show visual fixation on their examiner, move their eyes in response to an auditory stimulus, or move after often repeated commands. Patients with akinetic mutism are not paralyzed, but lack the volition to move. Many patients describe that as soon as they "will" or attempt a movement, a "counter-will" or "resistance" rises up to meet them.

== Types ==
Frontal akinetic mutism can occur after a frontal lobe injury

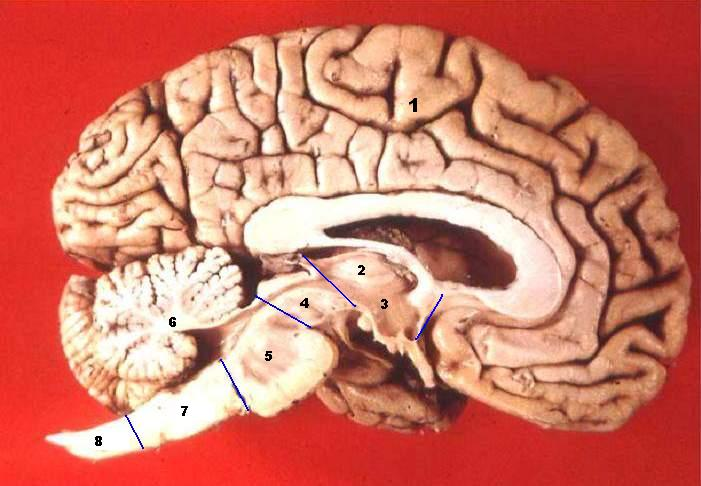
The mesencephalic form of akinetic mutism occurs in the midbrain (4)

Akinetic mutism varies across all patients. Its form, intensity, and clinical features correspond more closely to its functional anatomy rather than to its pathology. However, akinetic mutism most often appears in two different forms: frontal and mesencephalic.

=== Frontal akinetic mutism ===
Akinetic mutism can occur in the frontal region of the brain and occurs because of bilateral frontal lobe damage. Akinetic mutism as a result of frontal lobe damage is clinically characterized as hyperpathic. It occurs in patients with bilateral circulatory disturbances in the supply area of the anterior cerebral artery.

=== Mesencephalic akinetic mutism ===
Akinetic mutism can also occur as a result of damage to the mesencephalic region of the brain. Mesencephalic akinetic mutism is clinically categorized as somnolent or apathetic akinetic mutism. It is characterized by vertical gaze palsy and ophthalmoplegia. This state of akinetic mutism varies in intensity, but it is distinguished by drowsiness, lack of motivation, hyper-somnolence, and reduction in spontaneous verbal and motor actions.

== Symptoms and signs ==
- Lack of motor function (but not paralysis)
- Lack of speech
- Apathy
- Slowness
- Disinhibition

== Causes ==
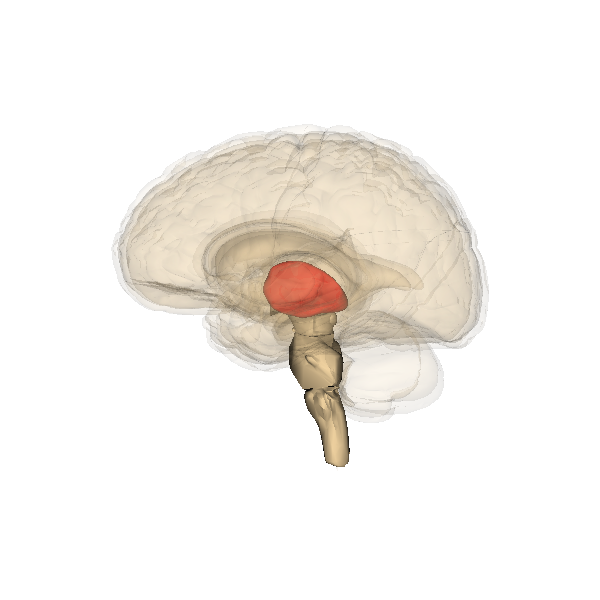
Many cases of akinetic mutism have occurred after a thalamic stroke.

Akinetic mutism can be caused by a variety of things. It often occurs after brain injury or as a symptom of other diseases.

=== Frontal lobe damage ===
Akinetic mutism is often the result of severe frontal lobe injury in which the pattern of inhibitory control is one of increasing passivity and gradually decreasing speech and motion.

=== Thalamic stroke ===
Many cases of akinetic mutism occur after a thalamic stroke.

=== Ablation of cingulate gyrus ===
Another cause of both akinesia and mutism is ablation of the cingulate gyrus. Destruction of the cingulate gyrus has been used in the treatment of psychosis. Such lesions result in akinesia, mutism, apathy, and indifference to painful stimuli. The anterior cingulate cortex is thought to supply a "global energizing factor" that stimulates decision making. When the anterior cingulate cortex is damaged, it can result in akinetic mutism.

=== Other ===
Akinetic mutism is a symptom during the final stages of Creutzfeldt–Jakob disease (a rare degenerative brain disease) and can help diagnose patients with this disease. It can also occur in a stroke that affects both anterior cerebral artery territories. Another cause is neurotoxicity due to exposure to certain drugs such as tacrolimus and cyclosporine.

Other causes of akinetic mutism are as follows:

- Respiratory arrest and cerebral hypoxia
- Acute cases of encephalitis lethargica
- Meningitis
- Hydrocephalus
- Trauma
- Tumors
- Aneurysms
- Olfactory groove meningioma
- Cyst in third ventricle
- Toxical lesions and infections of central nervous system
- Delayed post-hypoxic leukoencephalopathy (DPHL)
- Creutzfeldt–Jakob disease (mesencephalic form)
- Gerstmann–Sträussler–Scheinker syndrome

== Diagnosis ==
Akinetic mutism can be misdiagnosed as depression, delirium, or locked-in syndrome, all of which are common following a stroke. Patients with depression can experience apathy, slurring of speech, and body movements similar to akinetic mutism. Similarly to akinetic mutism, patients with locked-in syndrome experience paralysis and can only communicate with their eyes. Correct diagnosis is important to ensure proper treatment. A variety of treatments for akinetic mutism have been documented, but treatments vary between patients and cases.

== Treatment ==
=== Magnesium sulfate ===
Treatments using intravenous magnesium sulfate have shown to reduce the symptoms of akinetic mutism. In one case, a 59-year-old woman was administered intravenous magnesium sulfate in an attempt to resolve her akinetic mutism. The patient was given 500 mg of magnesium every eight hours, and improvement was seen after 24 hours. She became more verbal and attentive, and treatment was increased to 1000 mg every eight hours as conditions continued to improve.

=== Epidermoid cyst puncture ===
As seen in the case of Elsie Nicks, the puncture or removal of an intracranial epidermoid cyst causing akinetic mutism can relieve symptoms almost immediately. However, if the cyst recurs, the symptoms can reappear.

=== Dopamine agonist therapy ===
Symptoms of akinetic mutism suggest a possible presynaptic deficit in the nigrostriatal pathway, which transmits dopamine. Some patients with akinetic mutism have shown to improve with levodopa or dopamine agonist therapy, or by increasing dopaminergic transmission in the motivational circuit with stimulants, antidepressants, or agonists such as bromocriptine or amantadine.

Other treatments include amantadine, carbidopa-levodopa, donepezil, memantine, and oral magnesium oxide.

== History ==
Fourteen-year-old Elsie Nicks was the first patient to be diagnosed with akinetic mutism by Hugh Cairns in 1941. She suffered from severe headaches her entire life and was eventually given morphine to help with treatment. She began to enter a state of akinetic mutism, experiencing apathy and loss of speech and motor control. A cyst on her right lateral ventricle was tapped, and as soon as the needle advanced toward the cyst, she let out a loud noise and was able to state her name, age, and address. After her cyst was emptied, she regained her alertness and intelligence, and she had no recollection of her time spent in the hospital. The cyst was drained two more times over the next seven months and was eventually removed. After eight months of rehabilitation, Elsie no longer experienced headaches or akinetic mutism symptoms.

== See also ==
- Aboulia
- Athymhormic syndrome
- Catatonia
- Locked-in syndrome
- Selective mutism
