= Avolition =

Inability to initiate and persist in goal-directed activities

Avolition or amotivation, as a symptom of various forms of psychopathology, is the decrease in the ability to initiate and persist in self-directed purposeful activities. Such activities that appear to be neglected usually include routine activities, including hobbies, going to work or school, and most notably, engaging in social activities. A person experiencing avolition may stay at home for long periods, rather than seeking out work or peer relations. It is a disorder of diminished motivation.

== Psychopathology ==
People with avolition often want to complete certain tasks but lack the ability to initiate behaviors necessary to complete them. Avolition is most commonly seen as a symptom of some other disorder, but might be considered a primary clinical disturbance of itself (or as a coexisting second disorder) related to disorders of diminished motivation. In 2006, avolition was identified as a negative symptom of schizophrenia by the National Institute of Mental Health (NIMH), and has been observed in patients with bipolar disorder as well as resulting from trauma.

Avolition is sometimes mistaken for other, similar symptoms also affecting motivation, such as abulia, anhedonia and asociality, or strong general disinterest. For example, abulia is also a restriction in motivation and initiation, but characterized by an inability to set goals or make decisions and considered a disorder of diminished motivation. In order to provide effective treatment, the underlying cause of avolition (if any) has to be identified and it is important to properly differentiate it from other symptoms, even though they might reflect similar aspects of mental illness.

== Social and clinical implications ==
Implications from avolition often result in social deficits. Not being able to initiate and perform purposeful activities can have many implications for a person with avolition. By disrupting interactions with both familiar and unfamiliar people, it jeopardizes the patient's social relations. When part of a severe mental illness, avolition has been reported, in first person accounts, to lead to physical and mental inability to both initiate and maintain relationships, as well as work, eat, drink or even sleep.

Clinically, it may be difficult to engage an individual experiencing avolition in active participation of psychotherapy. Patients are also faced with the stresses of coping with and accepting a mental illness and the stigma that often accompanies such a diagnosis and its symptoms. Regarding schizophrenia, the American Psychiatric Association reported in 2013 that there currently are "no treatments with proven efficacy for primary negative symptoms" (such as avolition). Together with schizophrenia's chronic nature, such facts added to the outlook of never getting well, might further implicate feelings of hopelessness and similar in patients as well as their friends and family.

== Treatment ==
Antipsychotics are less effective in the treatment of negative symptoms of schizophrenia such as avolition than for positive symptoms. Low dose amisulpride has shown to be more effective than placebo for treating the negative symptoms of schizophrenia, which includes avolition. It works by blocking pre-synaptic dopamine receptors, causing a release of dopamine into the synapse.

Compared with social skills training (SST), cognitive behavioural therapy (CBT) shows more promise in treating the negative symptoms of schizophrenia, including avolition.

According to a 2015 article, aripiprazole may be useful for treatment of apathy syndrome (avolition). However, its role and efficacy in treatment of apathy requires further investigation in clinical trials. A comparison to amisulpride published in 2022, found that aripiprazole was effective in treating negative symptoms, while amisulpride was not.

According to a 2020 study, mitragynine contained in kratom may have the ability to reduce avolition.

== See also ==
- Athymhormia
- ADHD
- Amotivational syndrome
- Apathy
- Major depressive disorder
- Schizoid personality disorder
- Volition (psychology)
