= Hyperpathia =

Extreme perception of pain from normally painful stimuli

Hyperpathia is a clinical symptom of certain neurological disorders wherein nociceptive stimuli evoke exaggerated levels of pain. This should not be confused with allodynia, where normally non-painful stimuli evoke pain.

== Mechanism ==
Hyperpathia describes the neuropathic pain which the pain threshold on one hand is elevated and the other hand is central hyperexcited whenever there is a loss of fibres. Hyperpathia is underlying the peripheral or central deafferentation when the afferent inputs are lost. Hyperpathia only occurs on neuropathic pain patients with the loss of fibres.

The International Association of the Study of Pain's (IASP) definition of hyperpathia is that: A painful syndrome characterized by an abnormally painful reaction to a stimulus, especially a repetitive stimulus, as well as an increased threshold. The definition also complies with a note which is: It may occur with allodynia, hyperesthesia, hyperalgesia, or dysesthesia. Faulty identification and localization of the stimulus, delay, radiating sensation, and after-sensation may be present, and the pain is often explosive in character. The changes in this note are the specification of allodynia and the inclusion of hyperalgesia explicitly. Previously hyperalgesia was implied, since hyperesthesia was mentioned in the previous note and hyperalgesia is a special case of hyperesthesia.
