= Lethargy =

State of tiredness, weariness, fatigue, or lack of energy

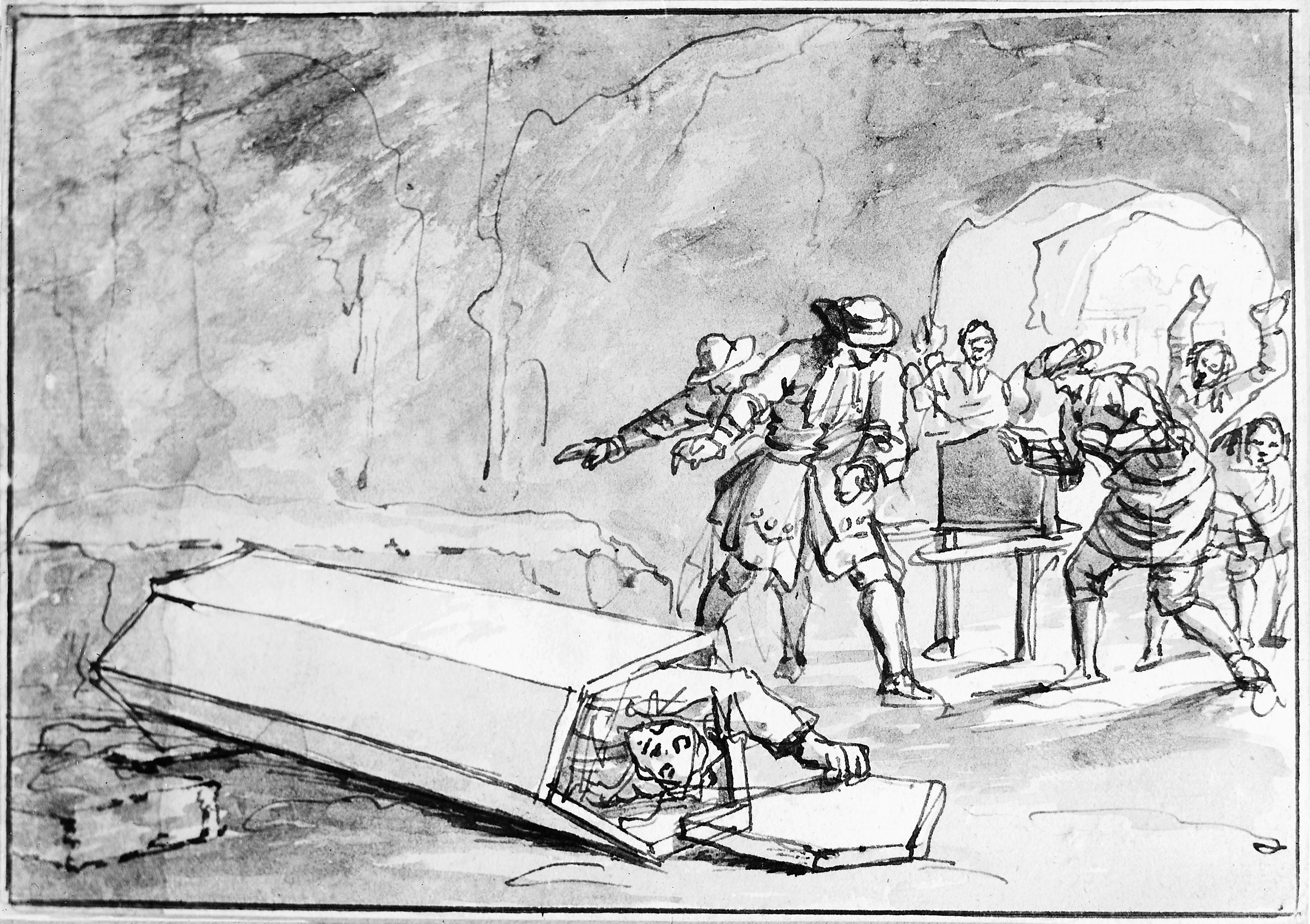
Antoine Marie, overcome with lethargy, buried, seemingly dead in 1696

Lethargy is a state of physical or mental weariness, fatigue, sluggishness, or lack of energy. It can be accompanied by depression, decreased motivation, or apathy, but can also present with having a desire, but not the energy to initiate or perform tasks. Lethargy can be a normal response to inadequate sleep, overexertion, overworking, stress, lack of exercise, improper nutrition, drug abuse, boredom, or a symptom of an underlying illness or disorder. It may also result from medication side effects, the consumption of illicit substances or an interaction between medications and alcohol. It may also be an altered level of consciousness.

When part of a normal response, lethargy often resolves with rest, adequate sleep, decreased stress, physical exercise, and good nutrition. Its symptoms, however, can last days or even months, so it can be a sign of a recent underlying illness or infection if it does not resolve normally.

== Etymology ==
The word lethargy originates from the Ancient Greek noun λήθαργος (lēthargía), formed from the adjective λήθαργος (lēthargos), which means "forgetful". It is root to the River Lethe, one of the five rivers in the Greek underworld whose waters caused those who drank from it to experience complete oblivion and forgetfulness.

== See also ==
- Clinical depression
- Disorders of diminished motivation
- Encephalitis lethargica
- Sleep apnea
- Sleep deprivation
- Somnolence
- Altered level of consciousness
