= Abulia =

Neurological symptom of lack of will or initiative

In neurology, abulia, or aboulia (from Ancient Greek: βουλή, meaning "will"), is a lack of volition, will, or initiative and can be seen as a disorder of diminished motivation. Abulia falls in the middle of the spectrum of diminished motivation, with apathy being milder and akinetic mutism being the most severe. The condition was originally considered to be a disorder of the will. Aboulic individuals are unable to act or make decisions independently, and their condition may range in severity from subtle to overwhelming. In the case of akinetic mutism, many patients describe that as soon as they "will" or attempt a movement, a "counter-will" or "resistance" rises up to meet them.

== Signs and symptoms ==
The clinical condition denoted abulia was first described in 1838; however, since that time, a number of different, some contradictory, definitions have emerged. Abulia has been described as a loss of drive, expression, behavior and speech output, with slowing and prolonged speech latency, and reduction of spontaneous thought content and initiative, being considered more recently as 'a reduction in action emotion and cognition'. The clinical features most commonly associated with abulia are:

- Difficulty in initiating and sustaining purposeful movements
- Lack of spontaneous movement
- Reduced spontaneous speech
- Increased response-time to queries
- Passivity
- Reduced emotional responsiveness and spontaneity
- Reduced social interactions
- Reduced interest in usual pastimes

Especially in patients with progressive dementia, it may affect feeding. Patients may continue to chew or hold food in their mouths for hours without swallowing it. The behavior may be most evident after these patients have eaten part of their meals and no longer have strong appetites.

=== Differentiation from other disorders ===
Both neurologists and psychiatrists recognize abulia to be a distinct clinical entity, but its status as a syndrome is unclear. Although abulia has been known to clinicians since 1838, it has been subjected to different interpretations – from 'a pure lack of will', in the absence of motor paralysis to, more recently, being considered 'a reduction in action emotion and cognition'. As a result of the changing definition of abulia, there is currently a debate on whether or not abulia is a sign or a symptom of another disease, or its own disease that seems to appear in the presence of other more well-researched diseases, such as Alzheimer's disease.

A 2002 survey of two movement disorder experts, two neuropsychiatrists, and two rehabilitation experts, did not seem to shed any light on the matter of differentiating abulia from other DDMs. The experts used the terms "apathy" and "abulia" interchangeably and debated whether or not abulia was a discrete entity, or just a hazy gray area on a spectrum of more defined disorders. Four of the experts said abulia was a sign and a symptom, and the group was split on whether or not it was a syndrome. Another survey, which consisted of true and false questions about what abulia is distinct from, whether it is a sign, symptom, or syndrome, where lesions are present in cases of abulia, what diseases are commonly associated with abulia, and what current treatments are used for abulia, was sent to 15 neurologists and 10 psychiatrists. Most experts agreed that abulia is clinically distinct from depression, akinetic mutism, and alexithymia. However, only 32% believed abulia was different from apathy, while 44% said they were not different, and 24% were unsure. Yet again, there was disagreement about whether or not abulia is a sign, symptom, or syndrome.

The study of motivation has been mostly about how stimuli come to acquire significance for animals. Only recently has the study of motivational processes been extended to integrate biological drives and emotional states in the explanation of purposeful behavior in human beings. Considering the number of disorders attributed to a lack of will and motivation, it is essential that abulia and apathy be defined more precisely to avoid confusion.

== Causes ==
Many different causes of abulia have been suggested. While there is some debate about the validity of abulia as a separate disease, experts mostly agree that abulia is the result of frontal lesions and not with cerebellar or brainstem lesions. As a result of more and more evidence showing that the mesolimbic and the mesocortical dopamine system are key to motivation and responsiveness to reward, abulia may be a dopamine-related dysfunction. Abulia may also result from a variety of brain injuries which cause personality change, such as dementing illnesses, trauma, or intracerebral hemorrhage (stroke), especially stroke causing diffuse injury to the right hemisphere.

=== Damage to the basal ganglia ===
Injuries to the frontal lobe and/or the basal ganglia can interfere with an individual's ability to initiate speech, movement, and social interaction. Studies have shown that 5-67% of all patients with traumatic brain injuries and 13% of patients with lesions on their basal ganglia experience some form of diminished motivation. It may complicate rehabilitation when a stroke patient is uninterested in performing tasks like walking despite being capable of doing so. It should be differentiated from apraxia, when a brain injured patient has impairment in comprehending the movements necessary to perform a motor task despite not having any paralysis that prevents performing the task; that condition can also result in lack of initiation of activity.

=== Damage to the capsular genu ===
A case study involving two patients with acute confusional state and abulia was conducted to see if these symptoms were the result of an infarct in the capsular genu. Using clinical neuropsychological and MRI evaluations at baseline and one year later showed that the cognitive impairment was still there one year after the stroke. Cognitive and behavioral alterations due to a genu infarct are most likely because the thalamo-cortical projection fibers that originate from the ventral-anterior and medial-dorsal nuclei traverse the internal capsule genu. These tracts are part of a complex system of cortical and subcortical frontal circuits through which the flow of information from the entire cortex takes place before reaching the basal ganglia. Cognitive deterioration could have occurred through the genu infarcts affecting the inferior and anterior thalamic peduncles. In this case study the patients did not show any functional deficits at the follow-up one year after the stroke and were not depressed but did show diminished motivations. This result supports the idea that abulia may exist independently of depression as its own syndrome.

=== Damage to anterior cingulate circuit ===
The anterior cingulate circuit consists of the anterior cingulate cortex, also referred to as Brodmann area 24, and its projections to the ventral striatum which includes the ventromedial caudate. The loop continues to connect to the ventral pallidum, which connects to the ventral anterior nucleus of the thalamus. This circuit is essential for the initiation of behavior, motivation and goal orientation, which are the very things missing from a patient with a disorder of diminished motivation. Unilateral injury or injury along any point in the circuit leads to abulia regardless of the side of the injury, but if there is bilateral damage, the patient will exhibit a more extreme case of diminished motivation, akinetic mutism.

=== Acute caudate vascular lesions ===
It is well documented that the caudate nucleus is involved in degenerative diseases of the central nervous system such as Huntington disease. In a case study of 32 acute caudate stroke patients, 48% were found to be experiencing abulia. Most of the cases where abulia was present were when the patients had a left caudate infarct that extended into the putamen as seen through a CT or MRI scan.

== Diagnosis ==
Diagnosis for abulia can be quite difficult because it falls between two other disorders of diminished motivation, and one could easily see an extreme case of abulia as akinetic mutism or a lesser case of abulia as apathy and therefore, not treat the patient appropriately. If it were to be confused with apathy, it might lead to attempts to involve the patient with physical rehabilitation or other interventions where a source of strong motivation would be necessary to succeed but would still be absent. The best way to diagnose abulia is through clinical observation of the patient as well as questioning of close relatives and loved ones to give the doctor a frame of reference with which they can compare the patient's new behavior to see if there is in fact a case of diminished motivation. In recent years, imaging studies using a CT or MRI scan have been shown to be quite helpful in localizing brain lesions which have been shown to be one of the main causes of abulia.

=== Conditions where abulia may be present ===
- Normal pressure hydrocephalus
- Major depressive disorder
- Persistent depressive disorder
- Attention deficit hyperactivity disorder
- Schizophrenia
- Frontotemporal dementia
- Parkinson's disease
- Huntington's disease
- Pick's disease
- Progressive supranuclear palsy
- Traumatic brain injury
- Stroke

=== Alzheimer's disease ===
A lack of motivation has been reported in 25–50% of patients with Alzheimer's disease. While depression is also common in patients with this disease, abulia is not a mere symptom of depressions because more than half of the patients with Alzheimer's disease with abulia do not have depression. Several studies have shown that abulia is most prevalent in cases of severe dementia which may result from reduced metabolic activity in the prefrontal regions of the brain. Patients with Alzheimer's disease and abulia are significantly older than patients with Alzheimer's who do not lack motivation. Going along with that, the prevalence of abulia increased from 14% in patients with a mild case Alzheimer's disease to 61% in patients with a severe case of Alzheimer's disease, which most likely developed over time as the patient got older.

== Treatment ==
Most current treatments for abulia are pharmacological, including the use of antidepressants. However, antidepressant treatment is not always successful and this has opened the door to alternative methods of treatment. The first step to successful treatment of abulia, or any other DDM, is a preliminary evaluation of the patient's general medical condition and fixing the problems that can be fixed easily. This may mean controlling seizures or headaches, arranging physical or cognitive rehabilitation for cognitive and sensorimotor loss, or ensuring optimal hearing, vision, and speech. These elementary steps also increase motivation because improved physical status may enhance functional capacity, drive, and energy and thereby increase the patient's expectation that initiative and effort will be successful.

There are five steps to pharmacological treatment:

1. Optimize medical status.
2. Diagnose and treat other conditions more specifically associated with diminished motivation (e.g., apathetic hyperthyroidism, Parkinson's disease).
3. Eliminate or reduce doses of psychotropics and other agents that aggravate motivational loss (e.g., SSRIs, dopamine antagonists).
4. Treat depression efficaciously when both DDM and depression are present.
5. Increase motivation through use of stimulants, dopamine agonists, or other agents such as cholinesterase inhibitors.

== See also ==
- Avolition
