= Reduced affect display =

Condition of reduced emotional reactivity in an individual

Reduced affect display, sometimes referred to as emotional blunting or emotional numbing, is a condition of reduced emotional reactivity in an individual. It manifests as low emotional expressivity, whether verbally or nonverbally, especially when talking about issues that would normally be expected to engage emotions. In this condition, expressive gestures are rare and there is little animation in facial expression or vocal inflection. Additionally, reduced affect can be symptomatic of autism, schizophrenia, depression, post-traumatic stress disorder, depersonalization-derealization disorder, and schizoid personality disorder. It may also be a side effect of certain medications (e.g., antipsychotics and antidepressants).

However, reduced affect should be distinguished from apathy and anhedonia, which explicitly refer to a lack of emotional sensation.

The ICD-11 identifies several types of affect disturbances, particularly focusing on variations in the reduction of emotional expression. Constricted affect refers to a noticeable limitation in the range and intensity of expressed emotions, though it is less pronounced than blunted affect. Blunted affect, in turn, describes a more severe reduction in emotional expressiveness, though not as extreme as flat affect, which is characterised by an almost complete absence of any observable emotional expression.

== Types ==
=== Constricted affect ===
A restricted or constricted affect is a reduction in an individual's expressive range and the intensity of emotional responses.

=== Blunted and flat affect ===
Blunted affect is a lack of affect more severe than restricted or constricted affect, but less severe than flat or flattened affect. "The difference between flat and blunted affect is in degree. A person with flat affect has no or nearly no emotional expression. They may not react at all to circumstances that usually evoke strong emotions in others. A person with blunted affect, on the other hand, has a significantly reduced intensity in emotional expression".

=== Shallow affect ===
Shallow affect has an equivalent meaning to blunted affect. In the Psychopathy Checklist, Factor 1 identifies shallow affect as a common attribute of psychopathy.

== Brain structures ==
Individuals with schizophrenia with blunted affect show different regional brain activity in fMRI scans when presented with emotional stimuli when compared to individuals with schizophrenia without blunted affect. For instance, individuals with schizophrenia without blunted affect show activation in the following brain areas when shown emotionally negative pictures: midbrain, pons, anterior cingulate cortex, insula, ventrolateral orbitofrontal cortex, anterior temporal pole, amygdala, medial prefrontal cortex and extrastriate visual cortex. Individuals with schizophrenia exhibiting blunted affect instead only show activation in the midbrain, pons, anterior temporal pole and extrastriate visual cortex.

=== Limbic structures ===
Individuals with schizophrenia exhibiting flat affect show decreased activation in the limbic system when viewing emotional stimuli. In these individuals, neural processes begin in the occipitotemporal region of the brain, routing through the ventral visual pathway and the limbic structures until they reach the inferior frontal areas. Damage to the amygdala of adult rhesus macaques early in life can permanently alter affective processing. Lesioning the amygdala causes blunted affect responses to both positive and negative stimuli. This effect is irreversible in the rhesus macaques; neonatal damage produces the same effect as damage that occurs later in life. The macaques' brain cannot compensate for early amygdala damage, even though significant neuronal growth may occur. There is some evidence that blunted affect in schizophrenia patients is not only caused by low amygdala response, but also lack of integration with other areas of the brain associated with emotional processing, particularly in amygdala-prefrontal cortex coupling. Damage in the limbic region prevents the amygdala from correctly interpreting emotional stimuli in individuals with schizophrenia by compromising the link between the amygdala and other brain regions associated with emotion.

=== Brainstem ===
Parts of the brainstem are responsible for passive emotional coping strategies characterized by disengagement or withdrawal from the external environment (quiescence, immobility, hyporeactivity), similar to what is seen in blunted affect. Individuals with schizophrenia with blunted affect show activation of the brainstem during fMRI scans, particularly the right medulla and the left pons, when shown "sad" film excerpts. The bilateral midbrain is also activated in individuals with schizophrenia diagnosed with blunted affect. Activation of the midbrain is thought to be related to autonomic responses associated with the perceptual processing of emotional stimuli. In individuals with schizophrenia, impaired connection of the midbrain and prefrontal cortex is associated with reduced emotional affect.

=== Prefrontal cortex ===
The prefrontal cortex, similarly to the limbic system, plays a role in the induction of an emotion and the regulation of emotions in healthy individuals. Individuals with schizophrenia show no changes in activation of the prefrontal cortex (PFC) when observing external sad stimuli, whereas healthy controls and patients with schizophrenia who were treated with quetiapine for blunted affect show activation of the medial PFC on fMRI. Individuals with schizophrenia who were reconditioned with quetiapine showed activation in other areas of the PFC as well, including the right medial prefrontal gyrus and the right and left orbitofrontal gyrus. This lack of PFC activity in people with schizophrenia with blunted affect has been postulated to be related to the impaired emotional processing observed in such individuals.

=== Anterior cingulate cortex ===
A positive correlation has been found between activation of the anterior cingulate cortex and the reported magnitude of sad feelings evoked by viewing sad film excerpts. The rostral subdivision of this region is possibly involved in detecting emotional signals. This region is different in individuals with schizophrenia with blunted affect.

== Diagnoses ==
=== Schizophrenia ===
Flat and blunted affect is a defining characteristic in the presentation of schizophrenia. To reiterate, these individuals have a decrease in observed vocal and facial expressions as well as the use of gestures. One study of flat affect in schizophrenia found that "flat affect was more common in men and was associated with worse current quality of life" as well as having "an adverse effect on course of illness".

The study also reported a "dissociation between reported experience of emotion and its display" – supporting the suggestion made elsewhere that "blunted affect, including flattened facial expressiveness and lack of vocal inflection ... often disguises an individual's true feelings." Thus, feelings may merely be unexpressed, rather than lacking. On the other hand, "a lack of emotions which is due not to mere repression but to a real loss of contact with the objective world gives the observer a specific impression of 'queerness' ... the remainders of emotions or the substitutes for emotions usually refer to rage and aggressiveness". In the most extreme cases, there is a complete "dissociation from affective states". To further support this idea, a study examining emotion dysregulation found that individuals with schizophrenia could not exaggerate their emotional expression as healthy controls could. Participants were asked to express whatever emotions they had during a clip of a film, and the participants with schizophrenia showed deficits in the behavioral expression of their emotions.

There is still some debate regarding the source of flat affect in schizophrenia. However, some literature indicates abnormalities in the dorsal executive and ventral affective systems; it is argued that dorsal hypoactivation and ventral hyperactivation may be the source of flat affect. Further, the authors found deficits in the mirror neuron system may also contribute to flat affect in that the deficits may cause disruptions in the control of facial expression.

Another study found that when speaking, individuals with schizophrenia with flat affect demonstrate less inflection than normal controls and appear to be less fluent. Normal subjects appear to express themselves using more complex syntax, whereas flat affect subjects speak with fewer words, and fewer words per sentence. Flat affect individuals' use of context-appropriate words in both sad and happy narratives are similar to that of controls. It is very likely that flat affect is a result of deficits in motor expression as opposed to emotional processing. The moods of display are compromised, but subjective, autonomic, and contextual aspects of emotion are left intact.

=== Post-traumatic stress disorder ===
Post-traumatic stress disorder (PTSD) was previously known to cause negative feelings, such as depressed mood, re-experiencing and hyperarousal. However, recently, psychologists have started to focus their attention on the blunted affects and also the decrease in feeling and expressing positive emotions in PTSD patients. Blunted affect, or emotional numbness, is considered one of the consequences of PTSD because it causes a diminished interest in activities that produce pleasure (anhedonia) and produces feelings of detachment from others, restricted emotional expression and a reduced tendency to express emotions behaviorally. Blunted affect is often seen in veterans as a consequence of the psychological stressful experiences that caused PTSD. Blunted affect is a response to PTSD, it is considered one of the central symptoms in post-traumatic stress disorders and it is often seen in veterans who served in combat zones. In PTSD, blunted affect can be considered a psychological response to PTSD as a way to combat overwhelming anxiety that the patients feel. In blunted affect, there are abnormalities in circuits that also include the prefrontal cortex.

=== Assessment ===
In making assessments of mood and affect the clinician is cautioned that "it is important to keep in mind that demonstrative expression can be influenced by cultural differences, medication, or situational factors"; while the layperson is warned to beware of applying the criterion lightly to "friends, otherwise [he or she] is likely to make false judgments, in view of the prevalence of schizoid and cyclothymic personalities in our 'normal' population, and our [US] tendency to psychological hypochondriasis".

R. D. Laing in particular stressed that "such 'clinical' categories as schizoid, autistic, 'impoverished' affect ... all presuppose that there are reliable, valid impersonal criteria for making attributions about the other person's relation to [his or her] actions. There are no such reliable or valid criteria".

=== Differential diagnosis ===
Blunted affect is very similar to anhedonia, which is the decrease or cessation of all feelings of pleasure (which thus affects enjoyment, happiness, fun, interest, and satisfaction). In the case of anhedonia, emotions relating to pleasure will not be expressed as much or at all because they are literally not experienced or are decreased. Both blunted affect and anhedonia are considered negative symptoms of schizophrenia, meaning that they are indicative of a lack of something. There are some other negative symptoms of schizophrenia which include avolition, alogia and catatonic behaviour.

Closely related is alexithymia – a condition describing people who "lack words for their feelings. They seem to lack feelings altogether, although this may actually be because of their inability to express emotion rather than from an absence of emotion altogether". Alexithymic patients however can provide clues via assessment presentation which may be indicative of emotional arousal.

"If the amygdala is severed from the rest of the brain, the result is a striking inability to gauge the emotional significance of events; this condition is sometimes called 'affective blindness'". In some cases, blunted affect can fade, but there is no conclusive evidence of why this can occur.

== See also ==
- Antonio Damasio – Portuguese neuroscientist (born 1944)
- Emotional detachment
- Emotional dysregulation
- Experiential avoidance
- Expressive suppression
- Narcissistic defences
- Labile affect
- Inappropriate affect
