= Apathy =

State of indifference, or the suppression of emotions

Mental state in terms of challenge level and skill level, according to Csikszentmihalyi's flow model. (Click on a fragment of the image to go to the appropriate article)

Apathy, also referred to as indifference, is a lack of feeling, emotion, interest, or concern about something. It is a state of indifference, or the suppression of emotions such as concern, excitement, motivation, or passion. An apathetic individual has an absence of interest in or concern about emotional, social, spiritual, philosophical, virtual, or physical life and the world. Apathy can also be defined as a person's lack of goal orientation. Apathy falls in the less extreme spectrum of diminished motivation, with abulia in the middle and akinetic mutism being more extreme than both apathy and abulia.

The apathetic may lack a sense of purpose, worth, or meaning in their life. People with severe apathy tend to have a lower quality of life and are at a higher risk for mortality and early institutionalization. They may also exhibit insensibility or sluggishness. In positive psychology, apathy is described as a result of the individuals' feeling, they do not possess the level of skill required to confront a challenge (i.e. "flow"). It may also be a result of perceiving no challenge at all (e.g., the challenge is irrelevant to them, or conversely, they have learned helplessness).

Apathy should be distinguished from reduced affect display, which refers to reduced emotional expression but not necessarily reduced emotion.

Pathological apathy, characterized by extreme forms of apathy, is now known to occur in many different brain disorders, including neurodegenerative conditions often associated with dementia such as Alzheimer's disease, Parkinson's disease, and psychiatric disorders such as schizophrenia. Although many patients with pathological apathy also have depression, several studies have shown that the two syndromes are dissociable: apathy can occur independent of depression and vice versa.

== Etymology ==
Although the word apathy was first used in 1594 and is derived from the Greek ἀπάθεια (apatheia), from ἀπάθης (apathēs, "without feeling" from a- ("without, not") and pathos ("emotion"), it is important not to confuse the two terms. Also meaning "absence of passion," "apathy" or "insensibility" in Greek, the term apatheia was used by the Stoics to signify a (desirable) state of indifference toward events and things that lie outside one's control (that is, according to their philosophy, all things exterior, one being only responsible for one's own representations and judgments). In contrast to apathy, apatheia is considered a virtue, especially in Orthodox monasticism. In the Philokalia the word dispassion is used for apatheia, so as not to confuse it with apathy.

== History and other views ==
Christians have historically condemned apathy as a deficiency of love and devotion to God and his works. This interpretation of apathy is also referred to as Sloth and is listed among the Seven Deadly Sins. Clemens Alexandrinus used the term to draw to gnostic Christianity philosophers who aspired after virtue.

The modern concept of apathy became more well known after World War I, when it was one of the various forms of "shell shock", now better known as post-traumatic stress disorder (PTSD). Soldiers who lived in the trenches amidst the bombing and machine gun fire, and who saw the battlefields strewn with dead and maimed comrades, developed a sense of disconnected numbness and indifference to normal social interaction when they returned from combat.

In 1950, US novelist John Dos Passos wrote: "Apathy is one of the characteristic responses of any living organism when it is subjected to stimuli too intense or too complicated to cope with. The cure for apathy is comprehension."

=== Social origin ===
Apathy has been socially viewed as worse than things such as hate or anger. Not caring whatsoever, in the eyes of some, is even worse than having distaste for something. Author Leo Buscaglia is quoted as saying "I have a very strong feeling that the opposite of love is not hate-it's apathy. It's not giving a damn." Helen Keller stated that apathy is the "worst of them all" when it comes to the various evils in the world. French social commentator and political thinker Charles de Montesquieu stated that "the tyranny of a prince in an oligarchy is not so dangerous to the public welfare as the apathy of a citizen in the democracy."

=== In the school system ===
Apathy in students, especially those in high school, is a growing problem. It can cause teachers to lower their standards in order to try to engage their students. Apathy in schools is most easily recognized by students being unmotivated or, quite commonly, being motivated by outside factors. For example, when asked about their motivation for doing well in school, fifty percent of students cited outside sources such as "college acceptance" or "good grades". On the contrary, only fourteen percent cited "gaining an understanding of content knowledge or learning subject material" as their motivation to do well in school. As a result of these external motivations rather than having a genuine desire for knowledge, students often do the minimum amount of work necessary to get by in their classes. This then leads to average grades and test scores, but little real grasp of knowledge. Many students stated that "assignments/content was irrelevant or meaningless", and that this was the cause of their apathetic attitudes toward their schooling, leading to teacher and parent frustration.

Other causes of apathy in students include situations within their home life, media influences, peer influences, school struggles and failures. Some of the signs of apathetic students include declining grades, skipping classes, routine illness, and behavioral changes both in school and at home. In order to combat this, teachers have to be aware that students have different motivation profiles; i.e. they are motivated by different factors or stimuli.

=== Bystander ===
Also known as the bystander effect, bystander apathy occurs when, during an emergency, those standing by do nothing to help but instead stand by and watch. Sometimes this can be caused by one bystander observing other bystanders and imitating their behavior. If other people are not acting in a way that makes the situation seem like an emergency that needs attention, often other bystanders will act in the same way. The diffusion to responsibility can also be to blame for bystander apathy. The more people that are around in emergency situations, the more likely individuals are to think that someone else will help so they do not need to. This theory was popularized by social psychologists in response to the 1964 Kitty Genovese murder. The murder took place in New York and the victim, Genovese, was stabbed to death as bystanders reportedly stood by and did nothing to stop the situation or even call the police. Latané and Darley are the two psychologists who did research on this theory. They performed different experiments that placed people into situations where they had the opportunity to intervene or do nothing. The individuals in the experiment were either by themselves, with a stranger(s), with a friend, or with a confederate. The experiments ultimately led them to the conclusion that there are many social and situational factors that are behind whether a person will react in an emergency situation or simply remain apathetic to what is occurring.

== Measurement ==
Several different questionnaires and clinical interview instruments have been used to measure pathological apathy or, more recently, apathy in healthy people.

=== Apathy Evaluation Scale ===
Developed by Robert Marin in 1991, the Apathy Evaluation Scale (AES) was the first method developed to measure apathy in clinical populations. Centered around evaluation, the scale can either be self-informed or other-informed. The three versions of the test include self, informant such as a family member, and clinician. The scale is based around questionnaires that ask about topics including interest, motivation, socialization, and how the individual spends their time. The individual or informant answers on a scale of "not at all", "slightly", "somewhat" or "a lot". Each item on the evaluation is created with positive or negative syntax and deals with cognition, behavior, and emotion. Each item is then scored and, based on the score, the individual's level of apathy can be evaluated.

=== Apathy Motivation Index ===
The Apathy Motivation Index (AMI) was developed to measure different dimensions of apathy in healthy people. Factor analysis identified three distinct axes of apathy: behavioural, social and emotional. The AMI has since been used to examine apathy in patients with Parkinson's disease who, overall, showed evidence of behavioural and social apathy, but not emotional apathy. Patients with Alzheimer's disease, Parkinson's disease, subjective cognitive impairment and limbic encephalitis have also been assessed using the AMI, and their self-reports of apathy were compared with those of caregivers using the AMI caregiver scale.

=== Dimensional Apathy Scale ===
The Dimensional Apathy Scale (DAS) is a multidimensional apathy instrument for measuring subtypes of apathy in different clinical populations and healthy adults. It was developed using factor analysis, quantifying Executive apathy (lack of motivation for planning, organising and attention), Emotional apathy (emotional indifference, neutrality, flatness or blunting) and Initiation apathy (lack of motivation for self-generation of thought/action). There is a self-rated version of the DAS and an informant/carer-rated version of the DAS. Further a clinical brief DAS has also been developed. It has been validated for use in stroke, Huntington's disease, motor neurone disease, Multiple Sclerosis, dementia, Parkinson's disease and schizophrenia, showing to differentiate profiles of apathy subtypes between these conditions.

== Medical aspects ==
=== Depression ===
Mental health journalist and author John McManamy argues that although psychiatrists do not explicitly deal with the condition of apathy, it is a psychological problem for some depressed people, in which they get a sense that "nothing matters", the "lack of will to go on and the inability to care about the consequences". He describes depressed people who "...cannot seem to make [themselves] do anything", who "can't complete anything", and who do not "feel any excitement about seeing loved ones". He acknowledges that the Diagnostic and Statistical Manual of Mental Disorders does not discuss apathy.

In a Journal of Neuropsychiatry and Clinical Neurosciences article from 1991, Robert Marin, MD, claimed that pathological apathy occurs due to brain damage or neuropsychiatric illnesses such as Alzheimer's, Parkinson's, Huntington's disease, or stroke. Marin argues that apathy is a syndrome associated with many different brain disorders. This has now been shown to be the case across a range of neurological and psychiatric conditions.

A review article by Robert van Reekum, MD, et al. from the University of Toronto in the Journal of Neuropsychiatry (2005) claimed that an obvious relationship between depression and apathy exists in some populations. However, although many patients with depression also have apathy, several studies have shown that apathy can occur independently of depression, and vice versa.

Apathy can be associated with depression, a manifestation of negative disorders in schizophrenia, or a symptom of various somatic and neurological disorders. Sometimes apathy and depression are viewed as the same thing, but actually take different forms depending on someone's mental condition.

=== Alzheimer's disease ===
Depending upon how it has been measured, apathy affects 19–88% percent of individuals with Alzheimer's disease (mean prevalence of 49% across different studies). It is a neuropsychiatric symptom associated with functional impairment. Brain imaging studies have demonstrated changes in the anterior cingulate cortex, orbitofrontal cortex, dorsolateral prefrontal cortex and ventral striatum in Alzheimer's patients with apathy. Cholinesterase inhibitors, used as the first line of treatment for the cognitive symptoms associated with dementia, have also shown some modest benefit for behavior disturbances such as apathy. The effects of donepezil, galantamine and rivastigmine have all been assessed but, overall, the findings have been inconsistent, and it is estimated that apathy in ~60% of Alzheimer's patients does not respond to treatment with these drugs. Methylphenidate, a dopamine and noradrenaline reuptake blocker, has received increasing interest for the treatment of apathy. Management of apathetic symptoms using methylphenidate has shown promise in randomized placebo controlled trials of Alzheimer's patients. A phase III multi-centered randomized placebo-controlled trial of methylphenidate for the treatment of apathy has reported positive effects.

=== Parkinson's disease ===
Overall, apathy is reported in ~40% of Parkinson's disease patients, with prevalence rates varying from 16 to 62%, depending on the study. Apathy is increasingly recognized to be an important non-motor symptom in Parkinson's disease. It has a significant negative impact on quality of life. In some patients, apathy can be improved by dopaminergic medication. There is also some evidence for a positive effect of cholinesterase inhibitors such as Rivastigmine on apathy. Diminished sensitivity to reward may be a key component of the syndrome in Parkinson's disease.

=== Frontotemporal dementia ===
Pathological apathy is considered to be one of the diagnostic features of behavioural variant frontotemporal dementia, occurring in the majority of people with this condition. Both hypersensitivity to effort as well as blunting of sensitivity to reward may be components of behavioural apathy in frontotemporal dementia.

=== Anxiety ===
While apathy and anxiety may appear to be separate, and different, states of being, there are many ways that severe anxiety can cause apathy. First, the emotional fatigue that so often accompanies severe anxiety leads to one's emotions being worn out, thus leading to apathy. Second, the low serotonin levels associated with anxiety often lead to less passion and interest in the activities in one's life, which can be seen as apathy. Third, negative thinking and distractions associated with anxiety can ultimately lead to a decrease in one's overall happiness which can then lead to an apathetic outlook about one's life. Finally, the difficulty enjoying activities that individuals with anxiety often face can lead to them doing these activities much less often and can give them a sense of apathy about their lives. Even behavioral apathy may be found in individuals with anxiety in the form of them not wanting to make efforts to treat their anxiety.

=== Other ===
Often, apathy is felt after witnessing horrific acts, such as the killing or maiming of people during a war, e.g. post-traumatic stress disorder. It is also known to be a distinct psychiatric syndrome that is associated with many conditions, more prominently recognized in the elderly, some of which are: CADASIL syndrome, depression, Alzheimer's disease, Chagas disease, Creutzfeldt–Jakob disease, dementia (and dementias such as Alzheimer's disease, vascular dementia, and frontotemporal dementia), Korsakoff's syndrome, excessive vitamin D, hypothyroidism, hyperthyroidism, general fatigue, Huntington's disease, Pick's disease, progressive supranuclear palsy (PSP), brain damage, schizophrenia, schizoid personality disorder, bipolar disorder, autism spectrum disorders, ADHD, and others. Some medications and the heavy use of drugs such as opiates may bring apathy as a side effect.

== See also ==
- Acedia
- Callous and unemotional traits
- Compassion fatigue
- Detachment (philosophy)
- Political apathy
- Reduced affect display
- Anhedonia
