= Kephalaia Gnostika =

Metaphysical treatise on cosmogony by Evagrius Ponticus

- Author: Evagrius Ponticus
- Language: Greek

The Kephalaia Gnostika (Greek: Γνωστικὰ Κεφάλαια, meaning Chapters on Knowledge, or Propositions on Knowledge) is a 4th-century work by Evagrius Ponticus. It is philosophical in nature, containing many themes on cosmology and metaphysics, and resembles the Neoplatonic Enneads in many ways.

== Structure ==
The Kephalia Gnostika has 6 books, each with 90 propositions (or "chapters").

== Manuscripts ==
Although most, but not all, of the original Greek text has been lost, there is a Syriac manuscript in the British Museum that contains many clear Origenist theories which had been denounced at the Council of Constantinople in 553. This version is typically referred to as the Syriac S_{2} version and was thought to be the only Syriac version until Antoine Guillaumont discovered another more complete and original Syriac version in the mid-1900s.

The other Syriac version, known as the Syriac S_{1} version, had been expurgated, with the more obvious Origenist content censured. For instance, the original Kephalaia Gnostika contains content about cosmic restoration and reintegration of all things into God (apokatastasis).

== Translations ==
There is a French translation and critical edition by Antoine Guillaumont (1958) and a more recent English translation by Ilaria L. E. Ramelli (2015). A Slovenian translation was published in 2015.

In 2023, an English translation comparing text from different manuscripts (including the Syriac S_{2} and S_{1} manuscripts, as well as Greek fragments) was published by Robin Darling Young, Joel Kalvesmaki, Columba Stewart, Luke Dysinger, and Charles M. Stang in The Gnostic Trilogy. The volume also contains English translations of the Praktikos and Gnostikos.

As the Kephalaia Gnostika is often difficult to interpret, scholars often rely on other writings such as Evagrius's lengthy Letter to Melania to help interpret the text.

== Creation account ==
In the cosmology of the Kephalaia Gnostika, there was a first creation, followed by a fall from the first creation and a second creation in which the current visible material world was created.

- First Creation: The "rational beings" (logikoi) or "minds" (noes) were created. They were united with God as part of "the Unity" (henad).
- The great pre-cosmic fall from the First Creation, or "the Movement" (kinesis): The "rational beings" (logikoi) or "minds" (noes) began to individually fall from "the Unity" (henad), with negligence being the first great sin. The "minds" then turned into "souls" (psyche). (Note: Kephalia Gnostika 3.28: "A soul is an intellect that, in its carelessness, has fallen from Unity and, due to its lack of vigilance, has descended to the order of praktikē." (Ramelli trans., 2015))
- Second Creation: God, in his benevolence, creates the visible current universe by giving bodies to the fallen souls so that they would not lapse into nothingness. (Note: Kephalia Gnostika 6.20: "Before the movement God was good and powerful and wise, and creator of incorporeal beings, and father of rational creatures, and omnipotent. But after the movement God has become creator of bodies, and judge and ruler ... But Father and Principle he is also before the creation of the incorporeal beings: Father of Christ, Principle of the Holy Spirit." (Ramelli trans., 2015)) The bodies became angels, human beings, and demons. Different elements make up each (Kephalia Gnostika 1.62). Intellect and fire constitute the angels, epithymia (bodily desires) and earth constitute human beings, and thymos (emotions) and air constitute the demons. (See also Plato's theory of soul.) (Note: Kephalia Gnostika 1.62: "A prevalence of intellect and fire is in angels, of epithymia and earth in human beings, and of thymos and air in demons." (Ramelli trans., 2015))

== Influence ==
Evagrius's Kephalaia Gnostika has heavily influenced many later texts, including Isaac the Syrian's homilies. Chapter 3 in the Second Part of Isaac's homilies is also known as the Kephalaia Gnostika, as it was inspired by Evagrius's work of the same name.

== See also ==
- Enneads
- Neoplatonism
- Hesychasm
- Origenist Crises
