= The Three Little Gators =

2009 children's picture book

- Author: Helen Ketteman
- Illustrator: Will Terry
- Language: English
- Genre: Children's picture book; Parody; Folklore
- Publisher: Albert Whitman & Company
- Publication date: March 2009
- Publication place: United States
- Pages: 32 (unpaged)
- ISBN: 978-0-8075-7824-7

The Three Little Gators is a 2009 children's picture book written by Helen Ketteman, with illustrations by Will Terry. A reptilian version of the classic fairy tale "The Three Little Pigs", it received positive reviews.

== Plot ==
Three small alligators, who live with their mother in an eastern Texas swamp, say goodbye to her as they decide to live on their own. The first little gator builds a house of sand, the second builds a house of wood, and the third a house of stones. While settling in their new homes, a boar destroys the house of sand, after which the first little gator goes to the second's house, but the boar also destroys the house of wood. Both escape from the boar and run to the third little gator's house. After the boar goes down the chimney, he runs away and never returns to eat the three little gators.

== Reception ==
The Three Little Gators received positive reviews. The School Library Journal recommended it as "A fun choice for libraries and classrooms", while Kirkus Reviews wrote, "Ketteman's text is lean and serviceable, with country-isms and onomatopoeia lending well to reading aloud." Publishers Weekly recommended it to readers from Texas, while remarking on the author's "subtle—if somewhat didactic—message about sloth" and admitting that "the tag lines [in this variation] are not quite as memorable as the original wolf's huffing and puffing".

Reviewers variously noted that Terry's illustrations, rendered in acrylic, were "[served by] glowing earth tones" and "colors [that] are vibrant yet ominous and swampy, [complimented by] wonderful textures". "[In] Terry's hilarious illustrations," said Kirkus, "[his] funny gators have distinct personalities, and the picture of the Boar stuck in the chimney is inspired." While otherwise enjoying Terry's "vibrant, funny" art, Sandra Kitain of the Library Media Connection had concerns over its parochial outlook.

In 2010, the book was a Wanda Gág Book Award Honor recipient alongside Maureen White's Sleep, Big Bear, Sleep.
