= Horme =

Deity in Greek mythology

In Greek mythology, Horme (/ˈhɔːrmiː/; Ancient Greek: Ὁρμή) is the Greek spirit personifying energetic activity, impulse or effort (to do a thing), eagerness, setting oneself in motion, and starting an action, and particularly the onrush in battle. She had an altar at Athens, where mainly the divine servants and relations of Zeus (including Pheme and Aidos, as well as Athena) had altars. Her opposite character is Aergia, a goddess of sloth and apathy. The word "horme" also refers to the philosophical concept represented by the goddess.

== Legacy ==
- The name 'horme' was adopted by Sir Percy Nunn, to refer to all the purposive behaviours (drives or urges) of an organism – whether conscious or not. He based this on a suggestion by Jung but saw it as having a wider significance than Jung's idea of relating the term to psychological values. Maria Montessori made this a central point of her later thinking, stressing that the behaviour of the child was driven by an inner urge to self-construct, to become the adult they were destined to be. This idea of the future drawing the child on (as opposed to child development being just driven by causality) was related to the Aristotelian concept of entelechy, which formed part of her Thomist education as a devout Catholic. The concept, but not the name, has been developed by writers such as James Hillman where he applies the idea to adults and refers to it as 'destiny' or the individual's daemon.
- In On Obligations, Cicero contrasts horme with reason as one of two aspects of the soul. He seems to be using where one would expect to see the word "passion" or "emotion″. In the Walsh translation, it is rendered "appetite".
- The Greek writer Arrian of Nicomedia owned a much-loved greyhound called Horme, whose character and name he recorded for posterity in his Kynēgetikos.
