= Noonday Demon =

Demonic figure

The term Noonday Demon (also known to be referred to as Noonday Devil, Demon of Noontide, Midday Demon or Meridian Demon) is used as a synonym and a personification of acedia, which stems from the Greek word ἀκηδία, meaning 'to lack care'. It indicates a demonic figure thought to be active at the noon hour which inclines its victims (most often monastics) to restlessness, excitability, and inattention to duty.

A similar phrase appears in the Hebrew Bible: Psalm 91:6 reads, "מִ֝קֶּ֗טֶב יָשׁ֥וּד צָהֳרָֽיִם": 'from destruction that despoils at midday'. This phrase also appears in the Alexandrian Greek in the Septuagint: "ἀπὸ πράγματος ἐν σκότει διαπορευομένου, ἀπὸ συμπτώματος καὶ δαιμονίου μεσημβρινοῦ." ('[you need not fear] the pestilence that walks in darkness, nor the destruction that wastes at noonday.'). In the Vulgate, Jerome's translation of the Septuagint into Latin, is a personification in the daemonium meridianum ("Non timebis ... ab incursu et daemonio meridiano"). This demonic personification is kept in the Catholic Douay-Rheims translation of the Old Testament of 1609 (Psalms 90:6). An exception is King James Version of 1611, where the translation follows the Hebrew: "the destruction that wasteth at noonday" (Psalm 91:6). The Orthodox Study Bible confirms the understanding of Saint Jerome and translates Psalm 91:6 as "Nor by a thing moving in darkness, Nor by mishap and a demon of noonday." Holman reported that an Aramaic paraphrasing text in the Dead Sea Scrolls of this Psalm from the first century speaks of demons and spiritual warfare as the Latin and Greek translations did.

In the writings of Evagrius Ponticus, a Christian monk and ascetic, the Noonday Demon is specifically responsible for acedia, which he describes as "daemon qui etiam meridianus vocatur", attacking the cenobites most frequently between the hours of ten and two. It caused a sentiment characterized by exhaustion, listlessness, sadness, or dejection, restlessness, aversion to the cell and ascetic life, and yearning for family and former life.

== Main manifestations ==
=== Inability to stay in one place ===
Presents as an urge to change scenery, restlessness. Monks affected were described by Evagrius Ponticus as a "runaway", someone who "fled from the spiritual battlefield".

=== Heightened concern in one's health and security ===
This particular manifestation presents as the temptation of gluttony, prevalent in monks who fasted until late in the afternoon, as they were easier to sway away from duties by thoughts of their health and stomach.

=== Loss of motivation for physical labor ===
Manifests mostly in the afternoon when it is hottest and monks have to fight the heat of the day.

=== Neglecting the rules and duties ===
While under the power of the Noonday Demon, monks would be tempted to neglect prayer and the feeling of being overwhelmed by duties being "too much" start to sink in.

=== General discouragement ===
The Noonday Demon would often cause monks to have feelings of overall discouragement that went as far as to call their vocation into question before eventually manifesting as a nervous depression.

== Counter-methods ==
=== Tears ===
There are several ways of combating the demon, one of which being tears. Tears were seen in Eastern tradition as an "acknowledgment of one's need for a Savior." This tactic is seen as an exact opposite of "lack of care" and would counteract the demon.

=== Ora et labora ===
Ora et labora is the balance of prayer and work in life and is said to be strictly practiced if meant to be used as a counter to the Noonday Demon.

=== "Talking back" to the Devil ===
This method is also known as the "antirrhetic method" and is the use of scripture or prayers to combat negative or evil thoughts that arise in oneself. It is seen as one of the most prominent ways to combat the demon, as Jesus himself used this method in the Judaean desert.

=== Memento mori ===
Memento mori is seen as a way to ground oneself in one's mortality, by meditating on death rather than life. It is a method of using life to decide where one's place in the afterlife would be, thus making the choice to act.

=== Perseverance ===
The last and most simple method to countering the demon is to simply stay on the path of duty, not allowing oneself to stray off the path. Maintaining focus and activity is used in order to keep the demon away, also known as the "essential remedy".

== See also ==
- Aboulia
- Acedia
- Anomie
- Christian demonology
- Demonology
- Sloth (deadly sin)
- Weltschmerz
- Lady Midday
