= Gnostikos =

4th-century Christian text

- Author: Evagrius Ponticus
- Language: Greek

The Gnostikos (Greek: Γνωστικός, meaning The Knower or The Gnostic) is a 4th-century work by the early Christian monk Evagrius Ponticus. The Gnostikos is a brief treatise consisting of 50 chapters, which contain exhortations for experienced monks. There are manuscripts of the Gnostikos in Greek (original), Syriac, and Armenian.

It also has collections of quotes from five theologians, who are Gregory of Nazianzus, Basil of Caesarea, Athanasius, Serapion of Thmuis, and Didymus the Blind. Much of the original Greek text has been lost, although the Syriac version is complete.

There are a few English translations, as well as a French translation by Antoine Guillaumont (1989). Other modern translations include Slovenian, Polish, Italian, and Dutch.

== Outline ==
Outline of Evagrius's Gnostikos:

- Chapters 1–3: Introduction
  - Chapter 1: Knowledge of the ascetic vs. gnostic
  - Chapter 2: Ascetic as passionless
  - Chapter 3: Gnostic as teacher
- Chapters 4–11: Virtues of the gnostic teacher
- Chapters 12–15: Need for gnostic to adapt self to disciples
- Chapters 16–21: Content of teaching: Exegesis
- Chapters 21–36: The comportment of the gnostic when teaching
- Chapters 37–43: Temptations and sins of the gnostic
- Chapters 44–48: Quotes from theologians
  - Chapter 44: Gregory of Nazianzus
  - Chapter 45: Basil of Caesarea
  - Chapter 46: Athanasius
  - Chapter 47: Serapion of Thmuis
  - Chapter 48: Didymus the Blind
- Chapters 49–50: Conclusion

== See also ==
- Praktikos
- Kephalaia Gnostika
