= Diligence =

Carefulness and persistent effort or work

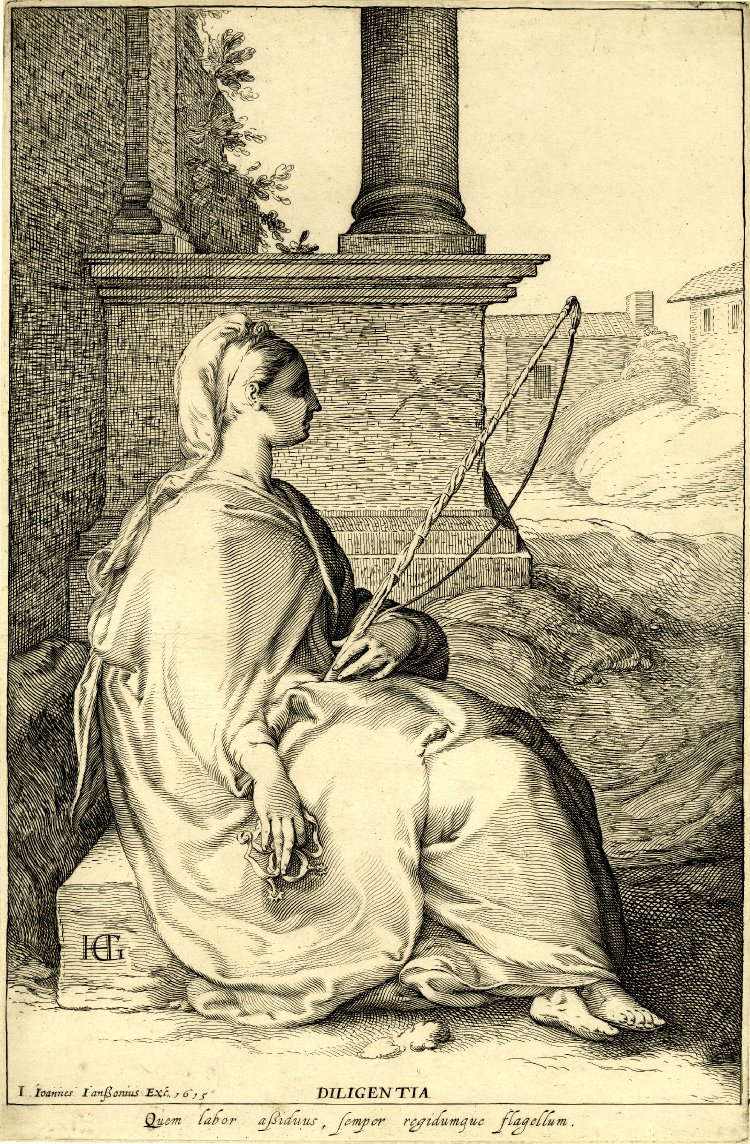
Diligence. The whip and spurs signify a drive to steadfastly move forward with one's means.

Diligence—carefulness and persistent effort or work—is listed as one of the seven capital virtues. It can be indicative of a work ethic, the belief that work is good in itself.

"There is a perennial nobleness, and even sacredness, in work. Were he never so benighted, forgetful of his high calling, there is always hope in a man that actually and earnestly works: in idleness alone there is perpetual despair." —Thomas Carlyle

== In students ==
Bernard et al. define diligence in students as the effort they put toward balanced and holistic development in mental, physical, social, and spiritual dimensions. They find that it correlates with academic performance, especially with younger students, and that the support of parents and educators encourages students to be diligent. Other factors that encourage student diligence include motivation, discipline, concentration, responsibility, and devotedness.

== In Buddhism ==
The last words of the Buddha were, "Strive on with diligence." Diligence is an integral part of all Buddhist teaching, and is considered the fourth of the pāramitā. In Mahayana tradition, diligence is the third pāramitā and the first said to lead to liberation, and it is said that its practice brings an increase of qualities.

== In Christianity ==
In Christianity, diligence is required to fulfill Christs command to make disciples. Matthew 28:19,20 Go, therefore, and make disciples of people of all the nations, baptizing them in the name of the Father and of the Son and of the Holy Spirit, teaching them to observe all the things I have commanded you. And look! I am with you all the days until the conclusion of the system of things. Diligence and effort are required to be true Christians as is confirmed by the Apostle James @ James 2:14,17 Verse 14 Of what benefit is it, my brothers, if someone says he has faith, but he does not have works? That faith cannot save him, can it? Verse 17 So, too, faith by itself, without works, is dead. And James 2:26 Indeed, just as the body without spirit is dead, so also faith without works is dead.

In other words, diligence, when combined with faith, assures spiritual success, as is brought out in the Bible book of Hebrews chapter six: verse 11 - But we desire each one of you to show the same industriousness so as to have the full assurance of the hope down to the end, 12 so that you may not become sluggish, but be imitators of those who through faith and patience inherit the promises.

It is listed in Seven Lively Virtues as the opposite of the Capital Sin of Sloth.

== In Islam ==
That man can have nothing but what he strives for; That (the fruit of) his striving will soon come in sight: Then will he be rewarded with a reward complete.

— the Quran,

Surah At-Taubah, Verse 105:

وَقُلِ اعْمَلُوا فَسَيَرَى اللَّهُ عَمَلَكُمْ وَرَسُولُهُ وَالْمُؤْمِنُونَ وَسَتُرَدُّونَ إِلَىٰ عَالِمِ الْغَيْبِ وَالشَّهَادَةِ فَيُنَبِّئُكُم بِمَا كُنتُمْ تَعْمَلُونَ

And say (unto them): Act! Allah will behold your actions, and (so will) His messenger and the believers, and ye will be brought back to the Knower of the Invisible and the Visible, and He will tell you what ye used to do.

— The Quran : 9-105,

== In Hinduism ==
According to Brian Hatcher, the precepts of Hinduism require a person to discover and live a dharmic life, in which they live with right intention with diligence, and with concern for the well-being of others. The Hindus celebrate Diwali, a festival of lights, where Goddess Lakshmi (also called Goddess Sri) is worshipped, who symbolizes thorough preparation, organization, diligence, and honesty. Hindus consider these characteristics essential for success and Shubh Labh (ethical profit).

Who so performeth – diligent, content – the work allotted him, whatever it be, lays hold of perfectness!

— the Gita 18:45,

== Due diligence ==
Due diligence is the amount of diligence required to avoid negligence in professional activities. It commonly arises in major acquisitions where the legal principle of caveat emptor ("let the buyer beware") requires the purchaser to make diligent inquiries about the property or service being sold.

== See also ==
- Acedia – Mental state
- Laziness – Disinclination to activity or exertion
- Orderliness
- Sloth – Laziness and apathy as a sin
- Virtue – Positive trait or quality deemed to be morally good
