= Aergia =

Ancient Greek goddess, the personification of sloth and laziness

In Greek mythology, Aergia (/eɪˈɜːrdʒə/; Ancient Greek: Ἀεργία, 'inactivity') is the personification of sloth, idleness, indolence and laziness. She is the translation of the Latin Socordia, or Ignavia: the name was translated into Greek because Hyginus mentioned her being based on a Greek source, and thus she can be considered as both a Greek and Roman goddess. Aergia's opposite character is Horme, a goddess of effort.

== Family ==
Aergia was the daughter of the primordial deities Aether and Gaia.

== Mythology ==
According to Statius, Aergia was said to be the 'torpid' guard in the court of Hypnos (Sleep) in the Underworld.

"In] the hollow recesses of a deep and rocky cave . . . [are] set the halls of lazy Somnus/ Hypnos (Sleep) and his untroubled dwelling. The threshold is guarded by shady Quies/ ?Hesychia (Quiet) and dull Oblivio/ Lethe (Forgetfulness) and torpid Ignavia/ Aergia (Sloth) with ever drowsy countenance. Otia/ Acratus (Ease) and Silentia/ ?Hesychia (Silence) with folded wings sit mute in the forecourt. . ."
