= Praktikos =

4th-century Christian book

The Praktikos
- Author: Evagrius Ponticus
- Language: Greek

The Praktikos (Greek: Πρακτικός) is a guide to ascetic life written by the early Christian monk Evagrius Ponticus. It was originally written in Greek, but also has Syriac and Armenian versions. This work is the best preserved of all the Evagrian writings due to the relatively large number of manuscripts and wide distribution (Bamberger 1972:lix-lx).

The Praktikos consists of 100 chapters. Of the 100 chapters of the Praktikos, demons are mentioned in 67 of them.

Although originally written in Greek, there are manuscripts of the Praktikos in Syriac, Armenian, Ethiopic (Ge'ez), Georgian, and Arabic.

== Outline ==
Below is a brief outline of the 100 chapters of the Praktikos.

- Introductory letter to Anatolius
- [1-5] Prologue
- [6-14] The eight kinds of evil thought (logismoi)
  - [7] Gluttony
  - [8] Impurity (lust; sexual immorality)
  - [9] Avarice
  - [10] Sadness
  - [11] Anger
  - [12] Acedia ("noonday demon"; sloth)
  - [13] Vainglory
  - [14] Pride
- [15-39] Against the eight passionate thoughts (logismoi)
- [40-56] Instructions
- [57-62] The state bordering on apatheia
- [63-90] On the signs of apatheia
- [91-100] Apophthegmata: Sayings of the holy monks
- Epilogue to Anatolius

A more detailed outline is given as follows:

- Preface: Letter to Anatolius on the symbolic meaning of monastic clothing
- Chapters 1–5: Introduction
  - 1: Christianity as faith/practice (praktikē), contemplation of nature (physikē), and knowledge of God (theologikē)
  - 2–3: Kingdom of God and knowledge of the Trinity
  - 4: Desire, feeling, passion
  - 5: The monastic combat against demons
- Chapters 6–14: On the Eight Thoughts (logismoi)
  - 6: List of the eight
  - 7: Gluttony (gastrimargia)
  - 8: Fornication (porneia)
  - 9: Love of money (philarguria)
  - 10: Sadness (lupē)
  - 11: Anger (orgē)
  - 12: Listlessness (acēdia)
  - 13: Vainglory (kenodoxia)
  - 14: Pride (huperēphania)
- Chapters 15–33: Against the Eight Thoughts
- Chapters 34–39: On the Passions
- Chapters 40–53: Instructions
- Chapters 54–56: On What Takes Place During Sleep
- Chapters 57–62: On the State Close to Passionlessness (apatheia)
- Chapters 63–70: On the Signs of Passionlessness
- Chapters 71–90: Practical Considerations
- Chapters 91–100: Sayings of Holy Monks
  - 91: Fasting joined to charity leads to purity of heart
  - 92: Antony and the philosophers
  - 93: Macarius the Egyptian
  - 94: Macarius [the Alexandrian]
  - 95–99: Anonymous apophthegms
  - 100: Loving the brethren
- Epilogue: Prayer to Christ; rejoicing for the intercession of Gregory of Nazianzus

== See also ==
- Hesychasm
- Gnostikos
