= Evagrius Ponticus =

4th-century Christian monk

Saint Evagrius Ponticus
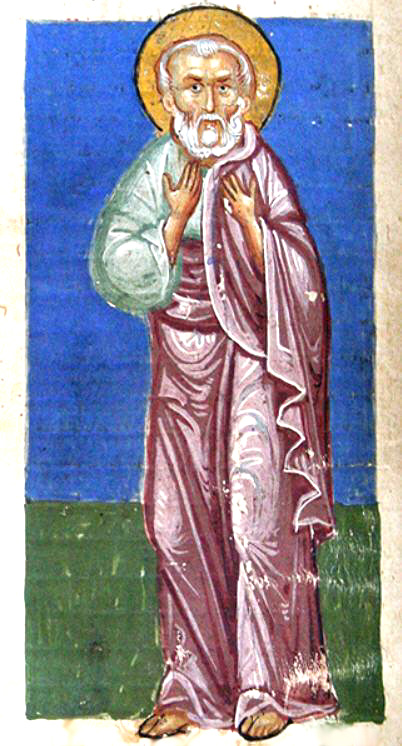

The Solitary
- Born: 345; Ibora (modern-day İverönü, Erbaa, Tokat, Turkey)
- Died: 399; Scetis (modern-day Egypt)
- Venerated in: Church of the East; Syriac Orthodox Church; Armenian Church
- Feast: January 30 (Church of the East); January 16 (Syrian); February 11 (Armenian)
- Influences: Origen, Didymus the Blind, Anthony the Great, Macarius of Egypt, Basil the Great, Gregory Nazianzen, Melania the Elder
- Influenced: Palladius of Galatia, Babai the Great, John Cassian, Isidore of Pelusium, The Tall Brothers (Ammonius, Dioscorus, Eusebius, and Euthymius), Melania the Younger, Rufinus of Aquileia, John of Apamea, Isaac the Syrian, John Damascene
- Major works: The Kephalia Gnostica, The Praktikos, De Oratione

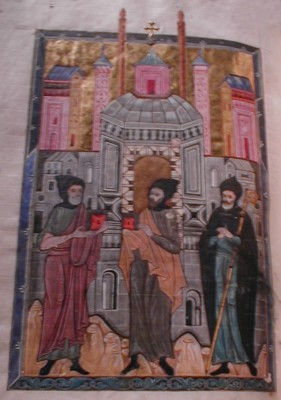
Evagrius Ponticus (left), John of Sinai, and an unknown saint. 17th-century icon.

Evagrius Ponticus (Ancient Greek: Εὐάγριος ὁ Ποντικός); (Syriac: ܐܘܓܪܝܣ ܦܘܢܛܝܩܝܐ; Awgrīs Ponṭīqāyā) also called Evagrius the Solitary (345–399 AD), was a Christian monk and ascetic from Heraclea, a city on the coast of Bithynia in Asia Minor. One of the most influential theologians in the late fourth-century church, he was well known as a thinker, polished speaker, and gifted writer. He left a promising ecclesiastical career in Constantinople and traveled to Jerusalem, where in 383 AD he became a monk at the monastery of Rufinus and Melania the Elder. He then went to Egypt and spent the remaining years of his life in Nitria and Kellia, marked by years of asceticism and writing. He was a disciple of several influential contemporary church leaders, including Basil of Caesarea, Gregory of Nazianzus, and Macarius of Egypt. He was a teacher of many others, including John Cassian and Palladius of Galatia.

== Life ==
There are five main sources of information on Evagrius's life. Firstly, there exists a biographical account in chapter 38 of The Lausiac History of bishop Palladius of Helenopolis (c. 420); Palladius was a friend and disciple of Evagrius, and spent about nine years sharing Evagrius's life in the desert. Secondly, there is a chapter on Evagrius in the anonymous Enquiry about the monks of Egypt, which predates Palladius, and is a first-hand account of a voyage taken by seven monks from Palestine in the winter of 394–395 to the principal monastic sites in Egypt. The final three sources are briefer and with more distinct biases: Evagrius features in some of the Apophthegmata literature, as well as in the church histories of Socrates and Sozomen.

Evagrius was born into a Christian family in the small town of Ibora, modern-day İverönü, Erbaa in the late Roman province of Helenopontus. He was educated in Neocaesarea, where he was ordained as a lector under Basil the Great. Around 380 he joined Gregory of Nazianzus in Constantinople, where Gregory had been installed as bishop, and was promoted to deacon. He stayed on in Constantinople after Gregory left in July 381, and eventually became an archdeacon. When Emperor Theodosius I convened the Second Ecumenical Council in 381, Evagrius was present, despite Gregory's premature departure.

According to the biography written by Palladius, Constantinople offered many worldly attractions, and Evagrius's vanity was aroused by the high praise of his peers. Eventually, he became infatuated with a married woman. Amid this temptation, he is said to have had a vision in which he was imprisoned by the soldiers of the governor at the request of the woman's husband. This vision, and the warning of an attendant angel, made him flee from the capital and head for Jerusalem.

For a short time, he stayed with Melania the Elder and Rufinus of Aquileia in a monastery near Jerusalem, but even there he could not forsake his vainglory and pride. He apparently took special care of his dress, and spent much of his time sauntering through the streets of the cosmopolitan Holy City. He fell gravely ill and only after he confessed his troubles to Melania, and accepted her instruction to become a monk was he restored to health. After being made a monk at Jerusalem in 383, he joined a cenobitic community of monks in Nitria in Lower Egypt in around 385, but after some years moved to Kellia. There he spent the last fourteen years of his life pursuing studies under Macarius of Alexandria and Macarius the Great (who had been a disciple of Anthony the Great, and lived at the monastic colony of Scetis, about 25 miles away).

Evagrius lived an ascetic life. He ate only once a day and did not consume fruit, meat or vegetables or any cooked food. He also refrained from bathing. Evagrius did not sleep more than a few hours each night and devoted much time to contemplation and prayer.

Evagrius is venerated as a Saint in the Syriac Orthodox Church, which celebrates his feast on January 16, and likewise in the Armenian Apostolic Church, which celebrates his feast on February 11.

== Writings ==
The following titles are considered authentic works attributable to Evagrius:

- Epistula fidei. This was probably written around 379 in Constantinople and is possibly Evagrius's earliest published work.
- Rerum monachialum rationes is also an early work, though from the time Evagrius was in Egypt.
- Tractatus ad Eulogium (= Treatise to the Monk Eulogius / To Eulogius) is also an early work.
- The Praktikos
- The Gnostikos
- Kephalaia Gnostica (Problemata Gnostica)
- De oratione (De oratione caputula = Chapters on Prayer). This consists of a prologue and 153 chapters.
- Antirrhetikos (Counter-Arguments), which lists 487 temptations and categorizes them into the 8 evil thoughts. Only the Syriac and Armenian versions survive.
- Institutio ad monachos (Exhortations to Monks)
- Sentences for Monks
- Ad virginem (Exhortation to a Virgin)
- Hypotyposis
- De diversis malignis cogitationibus
- De magistris et disciplulis
- Treatise on Various Evil Thoughts (Capita Cognoscitiva)
- Protrepticus
- Paraeneticus
- The Chapters of the Disciples of Evagrius
- 62 letters
- Various scholia also remain, including
  - Scholia on the Psalms
  - Scholia on Proverbs
  - Scholia on Ecclesiastes
  - Scholia on Job
- Scriptural commentaries
  - Commentary on the Psalms
  - De Seraphim (deals with the vision of Isaiah)
  - De Cherubim (deals with the vision of Ezekiel)
  - Commentary on the Pater Noster
  - Various ascetic treatises: De Justis et Perfectis

Although ascribed to Evagrius, these two works are considered to be of doubtful authenticity.

- De Malignis Cogitationibus
- Collections of Sentences

== Teachings ==
Most Egyptian monks of that time were illiterate. Evagrius, a highly educated classical scholar, is believed to be one of the first people to begin recording and systematizing the erstwhile oral teachings of the monastic authorities known as the Desert Fathers. Eventually, he also became regarded as a Desert Father, and several of his apothegms appear in the Vitae Patrum (a collection of sayings from early Christian monks).

Evagrius rigorously tried to avoid teaching beyond the spiritual maturity of his audiences. When addressing novices, he carefully stuck to concrete, practical issues (which he called praktike). For example, in Peri Logismon 16, he includes this disclaimer:

I cannot write about all the villainies of the demons; and I feel ashamed to speak about them at length and in detail, for fear of harming the more simple-minded among my readers.

His more advanced students enjoyed more theoretical, contemplative material (gnostike).

=== Logismoi ===
The most prominent feature of his research was a system of categorizing various forms of temptation. He developed a comprehensive list in AD 375 of eight evil thoughts (λογισμοὶ), or eight terrible temptations, from which all sinful behavior springs. This list was intended to serve a diagnostic purpose: to help readers identify the process of temptation, their own strengths and weaknesses, and the remedies available for overcoming temptation.

Evagrius stated that "The first thought of all is that of love of self; after this, the eight."

The eight patterns of evil thought are gluttony, lust, greed, sadness, acedia [despondency], anger, vainglory, and pride. The Greek and Syriac terms for Evagrius' canonical eight logismoi are:

English	Greek	Syriac
gluttony	gastrimargia	la‘buthā
sexual lust	porneia	zāniuthā
love of money	philargyria	rehmat kespā
sadness	lypē	‘aqthā
anger	orgē	rugzā / rigzā
acedia	akēdia	ma’inuthā
vainglory	kenodoxia	šubḥā sriqā
pride	hyperēphania	rmúthā

Some two centuries later in 590 AD, Pope Gregory I, "Pope Gregory The Great" would revise this list to form the more commonly known Seven Deadly Sins, where Pope Gregory the Great combined acedia (despondency) with tristitia (sorrow), calling the combination the sin of sloth; vainglory with pride; and added envy to the list of "Seven Deadly Sins".

=== Apatheia ===
In Evagrius's time, the Greek word apatheia was used to refer to a state of being without passion. Evagrius wrote: "A man in chains cannot run. Nor can the mind that is enslaved to passion see the place of spiritual prayer. It is dragged along and tossed by these passion-filled thoughts and cannot stand firm and tranquil."

=== Tears ===
Evagrius taught that tears were the utmost sign of true repentance and that weeping, even for days at a time, opened one up to God.

== Later reputation and influence ==
=== Accusations of heresy ===
Even in his own day, Evagrius's views had been criticised. A controversy over how to conceptualise God that broke out in the Nitrian desert in 400 saw dispute in which one side was influenced by Origenist views. Although Evagrius was not mentioned in this dispute, in 415 Jerome's Letter 133 accuses Evagrius of being a prominent Origenist, and critiques his teaching on apatheia.

Like the other Cappadocian fathers Gregory of Nazianzus and Basil of Caesarea, Evagrius was an avid student of Origen of Alexandria (c. 185-250 AD), and he further developed certain esoteric speculations regarding the pre-existence of human souls, the Origenist account of apocatastasis, and certain teachings about the natures of God and Christ.

=== Influence ===
The accusations of heresy meant that many of his more speculative writings were lost in the original Greek. Since, however, by the sixth century, many of his writings had been translated into Syriac and Armenian—the traditions unaffected by the decisions of the 553 Council—these works survived in these translations (and some of these sixth-century Syriac manuscripts survive today). In addition, substantial fragments of a Sogdian version of Evagrius's Antirrhetikos have been rediscovered as well.

Many of Evagrius's more ascetic works survive in Greek, often in manuscripts of the tenth century and after from Mount Athos and other monastic centres, although often attributed to Nilus of Ancyra, or occasionally to Basil or Gregory of Nazianzus. His exegetical scholia were incorporated into anthologies, sometimes with correct attribution, sometimes not (those on the Psalms were typically attributed to Origen). Only in the twentieth century was this set of ascetic works properly attributed to Evagrius.

In the Latin world, Evagrius’s friend Rufinus is known to have translated several of the works into Latin in the early fifth century, and others were translated decades later by Gennadius of Marseilles. Although these were the very first translations of Evagrius’s works, they have been entirely lost; only later Latin versions of two collections of proverbs (the Sentences for Monks and Sentences for a Virgin) and the treatise On the Eight Spirits survive. The Sentences were popular in Benedictine circles, ironically often attributed to “Evagrius the bishop.” The latter text was always attributed to Nilus.

Evagrius's influence was arguably greater in its indirect forms. Within the Greek literature of Byzantine monasticism, Evagrius’s presence is obvious in both the content and the format of works by Diadochus of Photike, Maximus the Confessor, John of Damascus, Symeon the New Theologian, and Gregory Palamas. In the Syriac world Babai The Great wrote a commentary on the Kephalaia, probably to stress Evagrius's orthodoxy. The fullest flowering of his influence was in the spiritual writings of Isaac of Nineveh, who relies heavily on Evagrius’s teaching on both the passions and prayer. In the Latin world, Evagrius's influence came in the way that John Cassian, one of his most faithful disciples, preserved and propagated the basic elements of Evagrius's teaching on the stages of the monastic life, tripartite anthropology, and the eight thoughts (although Cassian never mentions Evagrius by name, since his reputation was already tainted). Through Cassian, Evagrius's thought passed to Gregory the Great, and the Evagrian schema of eight generic thoughts afflicting the monks of Egypt was transformed into a list now famous as the Seven Deadly Sins.

== Works ==
Modern editions

- A list of modern editions of Evagrius's writings in Greek and Syriac, as well as German translations, is contained in Julia Konstantinovsky, Evagrius Ponticus: The Making of a Gnostic, (Ashgate, 2009), pp. 186–8, and in Columba Stewart, Imageless Prayer and the Theological Vision of Evagrius Ponticus, Journal of Early Christian Studies 9:2, (2001), pp. 202–4.

English translations

- Evagrius. The Praktikos and Chapters on Prayer. Cistercian Studies Series, vol. 4. Translated by John Eudes Bamberger OCSO. Kalamazoo: Cistercian Publications, 1972.
- On Prayer, One-Hundred and Fifty-Three Texts, The Philokalia, vol 1, ed and translated by Palmer, Sherrard and Ware, (London, 1979)
- Evagrius Ponticus. Chapters on Prayer. Translated and introduced by Sr. Pascale-Dominique Nau, OP, Bergamo, 2023.
- M Parmentier, 'Evagrius of Pontus and the "Letter to Melania"', Bijdragen, tijdschrift voor filosofie en theologie, 46, (Amsterdam, 1985), 2-38
- Evagrius Ponticus: Praktikos and On Prayer, trans Simon Tugwell, (Oxford: Faculty of Theology, 1987)
- 'Epistula fidei', in RJ Deferrari, Loeb 190, pp. 46–93
- G Gould, 'An Ancient Monastic Writing giving advice to spiritual directors (Evagrius of Pontus, On the Teachers and Disciples)', Hallel 22, (1997), pp. 96–103) [translation of De magistris et discipulis]
- 'Evagrius Ponticus, Antirrheticus (Selections)', translated by M O'Laughlin, in Vincent L Wimbush, ed, Ascetic Behavior in Greco-Roman antiquity: a sourcebook, (Minneapolis, 1990), pp. 243–62.
- Evagrius Ponticus: Ad Monachos, translation and Commentary by Jeremy Driscoll, ACW 59. (Paulist Press, 2003) [See also Jeremy Driscoll, The “Ad monachos” of Evagrius Ponticus: Its Structure and a Select Commentary, Studia Anselmiana 104 (Rome: Pontificio Ateneo S. Anselmo, 1991)]
- Evagrius. Evagrius Ponticus. Translated by Augustine Casiday. (New York: Routledge, 2006)
- Evagrius. Evagrius of Pontus: The Greek Ascetic Corpus. Translated by Robert E. Sinkewicz, (Oxford and New York: Oxford University Press, 2003).
- William Harmless and Raymond R. Fitzgerald, "'The Sapphire Light of the Mind': The Skemmata of Evagrius Ponticus," Theological Studies 62 (2001): 498–529.
- Martin Parmentier, "Evagrius of Pontus and the 'Letter to Melania,'" Bijdragen, tijdschrift voor filosofie en theologie 46 (1985): 2–38, reprinted in Forms of Devotion: Conversion, Worship, Spirituality, and Asceticism, ed. Everett Ferguson (New York: Garland, 1999), 272–309.

French translations

- Antoine Guillaumont & Claire Guillaumont, Évagre le Pontique, traité pratique ou le Moine, SC 170–171 (Paris: Éditions du Cerf, 1971). (Praktikos in French)
- Antoine Guillaumont, Évagre Le Pontique: "Le gnostique" ou, À celui qui est devenu digne de la science, SC 356 (Paris: Éditions du Cerf, 1989). (Gnostikos in French)
- Antoine Guillaumont, Les six centuries des "Kephalaia Gnostica": édition critique de la version syriaque commune et édition d'une nouvelle version syriaque, PO 28, fasc. 1 (Paris: Firmin–Didot, 1958). (Kephalaia Gnostica in French)
- Paul Géhin, Claire Guillaumont, and Antoine Guillaumont, eds., Évagre le Pontique: sur les pensées, SC 438 (Paris: Éditions du Cerf, 1998). (Peri logismōn in French)
- Paul Géhin, Évagre le Pontique: scholies aux Proverbes, SC 340 (Paris: Éditions du Cerf, 1987).
- Paul Géhin, Évagre le Pontique: scholies à l'Ecclésiaste, SC 397 (Paris: Éditions du Cerf, 1993).
