= Didymus the Blind =

4th century Alexandrian Christian theologian

Saint Didymus the Blind
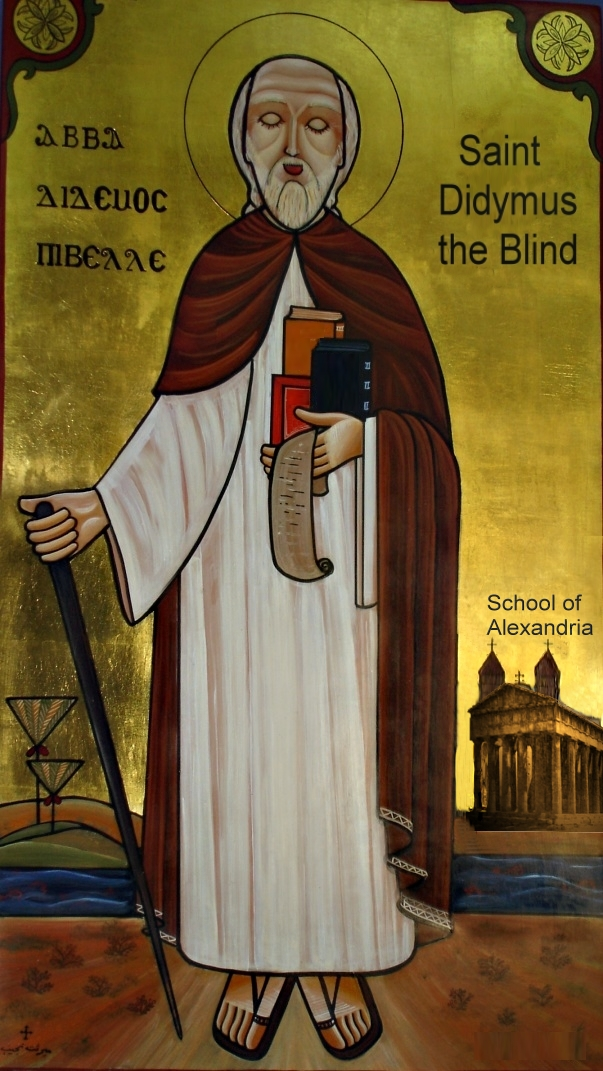
- Saint Didymus the Blind

Dean of the Theological School of Alexandria
- Born: c. 313
- Died: c. 398
- Venerated in: Coptic Orthodoxy; Syriac Orthodoxy
- Feast: 6 Paoni (Coptic Church)
- Patronage: The Blind

Didymus the Blind (Coptic: Ⲇⲓⲇⲩⲙⲟⲥ Ⲡⲓⲃⲉⲗⲗⲉ; c. 313 – 398) was a Christian theologian in the Church of Alexandria, where he taught for about half a century. He was a student of Origen, and, after the Second Council of Constantinople condemned Origen, Didymus's works were not copied. Many of his writings are lost, but some of his commentaries and essays survive. He was seen as intelligent and a good teacher.

== Early life and education ==
Didymus became blind at the age of four, before he had learned to read. He was a loyal follower of Origen, and opposed Arian and Macedonian teachings.

Despite his blindness, Didymus excelled in scholarship because of his incredible memory. He found ways to help blind people to read, experimenting with carved wooden letters similar to Braille systems used by the blind today. He recalled and contemplated information while others slept.

== Teacher in Alexandria ==
According to Rufinus, Didymus was "a teacher in the Church school", who was "approved by Bishop Athanasius" and other learned churchmen. Later scholars believed he was the head of the Catechetical School of Alexandria. However, the Catechetical School of Alexandria may not have existed in Didymus' time, and Rufinus may have been referring to a different school. Didymus remained a layman all his life and became one of the most learned ascetics of his time. He was the first Alexandrian Christian who made use of Hermetica as pagan prophecy of the coming of the Christ. Palladius, Rufinus, and Jerome were among his pupils.

Rufinus was Didymus's pupil for eight years. When he translated Origen's De principiis into Latin, he referenced Didymus's commentary on it. Jerome mentions Didymus's contributions to his ideas in the prefaces of many of his books, and called Didymus "Didymus the Seer." Rufinus remained loyal to Didymus after Jerome condemned Didymus and Origen. Didymus was viewed as an orthodox Christian teacher and was greatly respected and admired up until at least 553. Socrates of Constantinople compared Didymus's faithfulness to the Nicene Creed to Basil of Caesarea and Gregory of Nazianzus. In his position as a teacher, he held discussions and learned from Jews, pagans, Manichees, and other Christian teachers. Records of Didymus's lectures and the questions students asked show that he taught the same educated pupils multiple times.

Several Oriental Orthodox Churches refer to him as Saint Didymus the Blind.

== Second Council of Constantinople ==
In 553 the Second Council of Constantinople condemned his works, along with those of Origen and Evagrius Ponticus, but not his person. In the Third Council of Constantinople in 680, and in the 787 Second Council of Nicaea, Didymus was again linked with and condemned with Origen. Many unconventional views became associated with Origen, and the 15 anathemas attributed to the council condemn a form of apocatastasis along with the pre-existence of the soul, animism (in this context, a heterodox Christology), and a denial of real and lasting resurrection of the body.

In spite of the condemnation of his works, he is still listed as "St. Didymus the Blind" in the Serbian Orthodox hagiography The Prologue of Ohrid which gives his feast date as October 18.

== Works ==
As a result of his condemnation, many of his works were not copied during the Middle Ages and were subsequently lost. Of his lost compositions we can gather a partial list from the citations of ancient authors which includes On Dogmas, On The Death of Young Children, Against the Arians, First Word, and others. One of Didymus's lost works is a commentary on Origen's First Principles which, according to Jerome, tried to interpret an orthodox understanding of the Trinity from Origen's theology. In it, he assumed the pre-existence of souls and Apocatastasis. He staunchly defended the doctrine of the Trinity. He argued that Christ's body and soul were human, but that Christ was sinless.

Excerpts from Didymus's Biblical commentary have been found in the Catena.

Modern knowledge of Didymus has been greatly increased by a group of 6th or 7th century papyrus codices discovered in 1941 at a munitions dump near Tura, Egypt (south of Cairo). These include his commentaries on Zechariah, Genesis 1–17, part of Job and parts (of uncertain authenticity) on Ecclesiastes and Psalms 20–46. In these commentaries, Didymus discusses long quotations from the Bible, and refrains from speculation, which he considered sophistry. However, he interprets scriptures allegorically, seeing symbols everywhere. For example, he wrote that the mountains in Zechariah represented the two Testaments of the Bible. Didymus saw an individual's movement towards virtue as emerging from their interaction with scripture.

Didymus probably wrote the treatise On The Holy Spirit (written sometime before 381 in Greek), which was preserved in a Latin translation by Jerome. Commentary on the Catholic Epistles also is dubiously attributed to Didymus. The treatise Against the Manichees was also probably written by Didymus. There has been greater doubt over two further works traditionally attributed to Didymus. On The Trinity, identified in the eighteenth century as being Didymus' work, saw twentieth-century doubts, largely on grounds of lack of 'provenance' and alleged inconsistencies with the commentaries discovered at Tura in 1941, but many would still see this as Didymus' work. Additionally, scholars do not believe that Didymus authored the work preserved as books 4 and 5 of Basil's Against Eunomius.

Within the Commentary on Zechariah, Didymus shows himself to be a thoroughly intertextual reader of scripture. He moves from the text he is commenting on to a wide variety of other passages, quoting less frequently from the historical books which do not suit his allegorical method. Besides the gift of having a mind like a concordance, he also shows familiarity with philosophical terms and categories of the Stoics, Epicureans, and Pythagoreans (from whom, with Philo, he derives his occasional number symbolism hermeneutic). His works also seem to cite passages from the deuterocanonical books of the Old Testament as well as Barnabas, the Shepherd of Hermas and the Acts of John. According to Bart Ehrman, his canon extended to at least include Barnabas and the Shepherd. It has been suggested by R.M. Grant regarding Origen's similarly expanded canon that while he lived in Alexandria he accepted the broader tradition of the church in Alexandria, but upon moving to Caesarea and finding the books were not accepted there henceforth manifested greater reserve towards them. Why Didymus would not have inherited his teachers later hesitation is unclear. Among his peers his hermeneutical method seems to have been met with mixed reactions. Jerome, who requested his commentary and considered him a mentor, is still baffled by Didymus's use of what he considered apocryphal works. Readers such as Diodore in Antioch found his hermeneutical approach somewhat gratuitous and arbitrary. What none seem to deny, however, is that Didymus was unhindered by blindness in his remarkable ability to recall the sacred text.

A commentary attributed to Didymus that survives only in Latin suggests the epistle 2 Peter was forged, anticipating the beliefs of later scholars who would agree with the position that Peter was not the author of the letter. That said, it is doubtful that Didymus was the true author, as his other writings treat 2 Peter as canonical.

The no longer extant treatise On The Death of Young Children was addressed to Tyrannius Rufinus to answer his question "Why do infants die?". According to Jerome, Didymus's answer was that these infants "had not sinned much [in the pre-existence], and therefore it was enough punishment for them just to have touched their bodily prisons".

== Thought ==
Thoroughly Trinitarian, Didymus makes God completely transcendent and only capable of being spoken of by images and apophatic means. He repeatedly emphasizes that God's essence is beyond essence, and uses a term only seen otherwise in Cyril of Alexandria, "without quantity." There can be seen in his works influence from the Cappadocian Fathers, focusing the concept of Hypostasis (philosophy) to express the independent reality of the three persons of the Trinity rather than beginning with the one divine substance (οὐσία) as his starting point. Within these three persons, the Father is the root of the Divinity, the Spirit proceeds from the Father, and the Son is generated. Didymus seemed very concerned with stressing the equality of the persons of the Trinity. In Georges Florovsky's opinion, "Didymus does not strive for precision in his formulations. This is a general feature of the school of Alexandria."

In combating the heresies of the Manichaean Docetists and Apollinarians, we should not be surprised to find Didymus insisting on the fullness of the human nature of Christ. He concludes there must be two natures united in Christ, not speculating on precisely how these work together but restricting himself to the expression "a single Christ." In his atonement theory, Didymus does not mention deification, but rather focuses on the ransom and the restoration of the image and the likeness. The fragmentary nature of his writing at this point does not allow us to draw definite conclusions, but he does speak of "universal salvation." Jerome, probably correctly, accused Didymus of confessing the ultimate restoration of the devil.

Didymus seems to have also accepted the pre-existence of souls, and considers the afterlife as a process of purification, though, according to Florovsky, he rejects metempsychosis. He describes the Day of the Lord as an internal illumination of the soul, and in the future world he believes that evil "as a quality" will no longer exist. For him, as in Clement and Origen, the true gnostics possess a divine philosophy, one which allows them to defend themselves against heretics by giving a clear confession of the faith. Throughout his theology the influence of Origen is revealed, various aspects of which, particularly his eschatology, must have led to the condemnation of his works.

== In literature ==
Didymus the Blind is portrayed in Flow Down Like Silver, Hypatia of Alexandria by Ki Longfellow.
