= Antoine Guillaumont =

French archaeologist and Syriac scholar

Antoine Guillaumont (13 January 1915, L'Arbresle – 25 August 2000) was a French archaeologist and Syriac scholar. He held positions notably at the École pratique des hautes études and the Collège de France, and was a member of the Académie des Inscriptions et Belles-Lettres. His archaeological writings are related to the site of Kellia in Lower Egypt. As a Syriacist he was most interested in early monasticism and in the reception of the writings of Evagrius Ponticus.

From 1954 to 1971, Guillaumont was the editor-in-chief of the academic quarterly Revue de l'histoire des religions, edited by the Collège de France since 1880. During the 1980s. he was also the President of the Ernest Renan Society which was the francophone branch of The International Association for the History of Religions

== Works ==
- Kellia I Kom 219. Fouilles exécutées en 1964 et 1965, 6 vols. (Feuilles de l'Institut Français d'Archéologie Orientale du Caire, t.XXVIII)(with François Daumas).
- Les 'Kephalaia Gnostica' d'Evagre le Pontique et l'histoire de l'Origénisme chez les Grecs et chez les Syriens (Patristica Sorbonensia, 5), Seuil, 1962.
- Aux origines du monachisme chrétien; pour une phénoménologie du monachisme, 1979 (Bellefontaine, Spiritualité orientale, no. 30).
- Les 'remnuoth de saint Jérôme in Christianisme d' Egypte, Paris, Louvain, .
- contributor to M. Albert et al., Christianismes Orientaux, Introduction à l'étude des langues et des littératures.
- Un philosophe au désert, Evagre le Pontique, Vrin, 2004.
