= Acedia =

Mental state

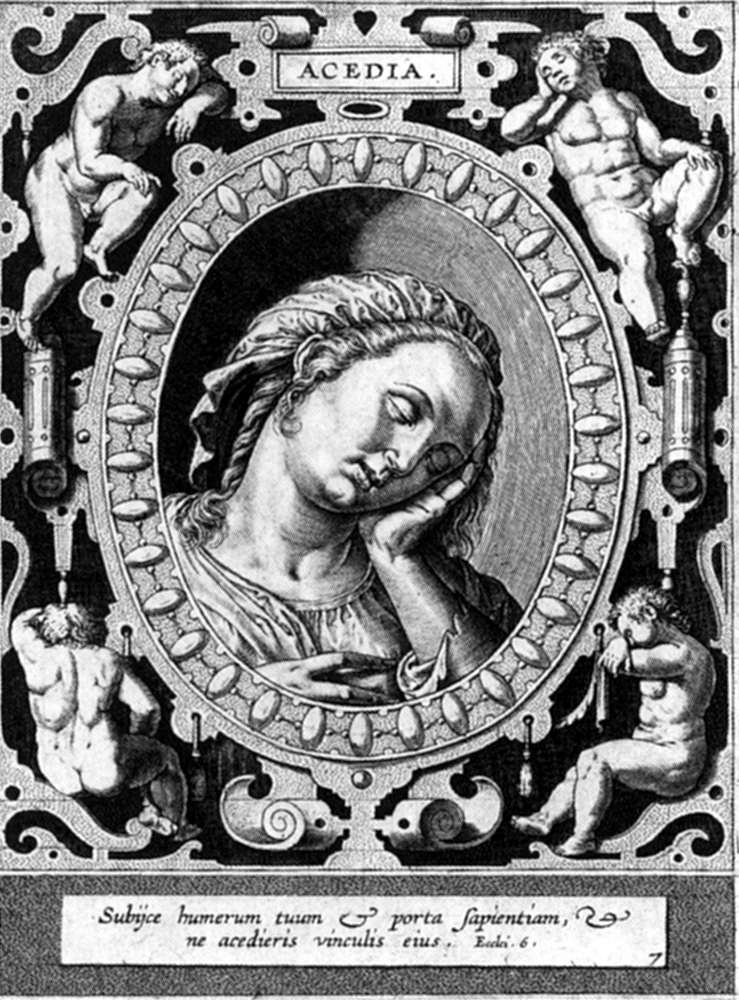
Acedia, engraving by Hieronymus Wierix, 16th century

Acedia (/əˈsiːdiə/ ə-SEE-dee-ə; also accidie or accedie /ˈæksɪdi/ ACK-sih-dee, from Latin acēdia, and this from Greek ἀκηδία, 'negligence', from ἀ- 'lack of' and -κηδία 'care') has been variously defined as a state of listlessness or torpor, of not caring or not being concerned with one's position or condition in the world. In ancient Greece, akēdía literally meant an inert state without pain or care. Early Christian monks used the term to define a spiritual state of listlessness, and from there the term developed a markedly Christian moral tone. In modern times, it has been taken up by literary figures and connected to depression.

== In ancient Greece ==
"Acedia" from Book 24 of the Iliad as it appears in the Banks Homer papyrus, British Museum

In Ancient Greece, acedia originally meant indifference or carelessness along the lines of its etymological meaning of lack of care. Thus, Homer in the Iliad uses it to both mean soldiers heedless of a comrade (τῶν δ᾽ ἄλλων οὔ τίς εὑ ἀκήδεσεν, "and none of the other [soldiers] was heedless of him.") and the body of Hector lying unburied and dishonored in the camp of the Acheans (μή πω μ᾽ ἐς θρόνον ἵζε διοτρεφὲς ὄφρά κεν Ἕκτωρ κεῖται ἐνὶ κλισίῃσιν ἀκηδής. "Seat me not anywise upon a chair, O thou fostered of Zeus, so long as Hector lieth uncared-for amid the huts."). Hesiod uses it in the sense of "indifferent" (ἀνίκητος καὶ ἀκηδὴς, "unconquered and untroubled"). Peter Toohey, in his article Acedia in Late Classical Antiquity, argues that acedia, even in ancient times, was synonymous with depression.

== Depictions in the early Christian era ==
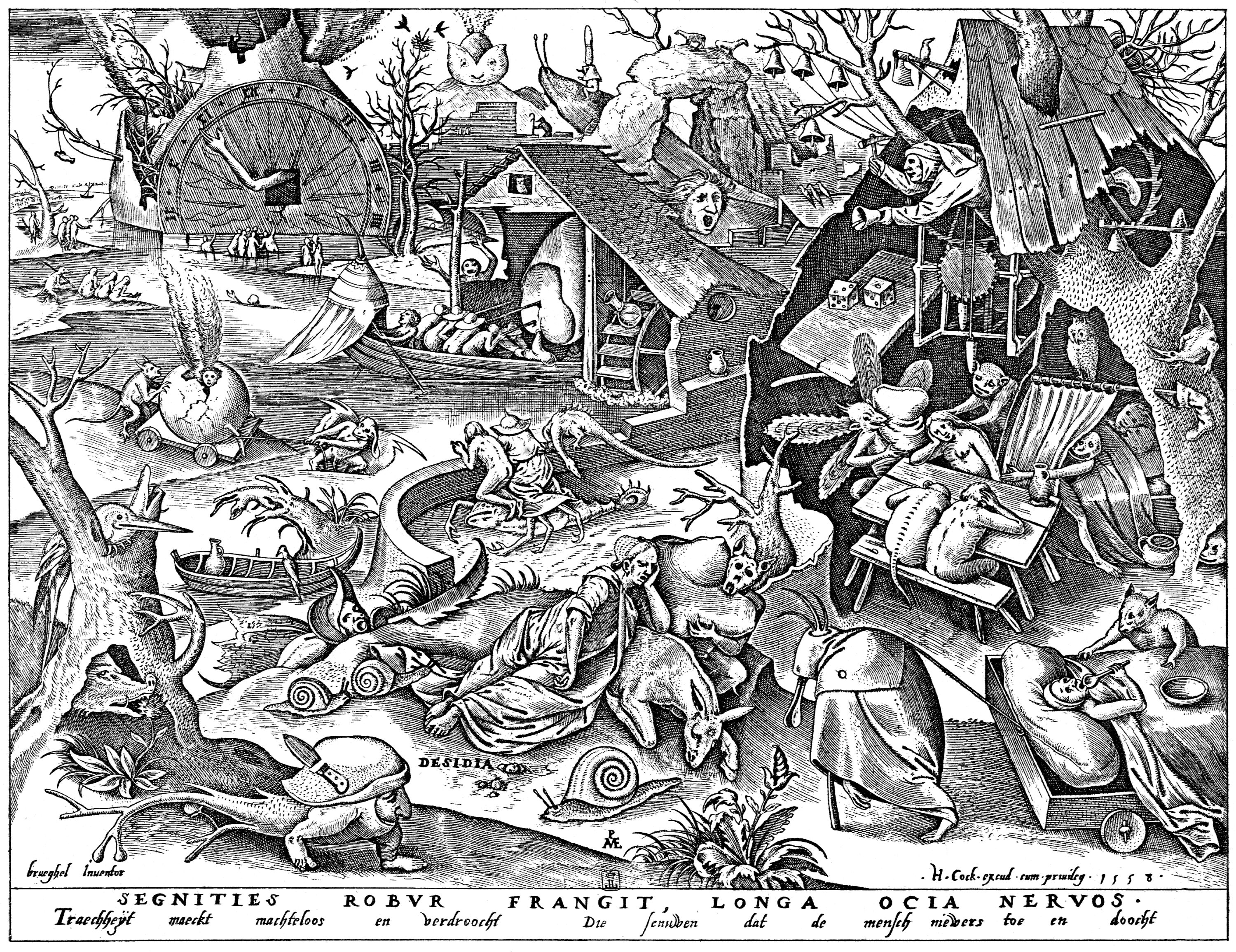
Acedia depicted by Pieter Bruegel the elder

Moral theologians, intellectual historians, and cultural critics have variously construed acedia as the ancient depiction of a variety of psychological states, behaviors, or existential conditions—primarily laziness, apathy, ennui, or boredom.

The demon of acedia holds an important place in early monastic demonology and protopsychology. In the late fourth century, Evagrius of Pontus, for example, characterizes it as "the most troublesome of all" of the eight genera of evil thoughts. As with those who followed him, Evagrius sees acedia as a temptation, and the great danger lies in giving in to it. Evagrius' contemporary, the Desert Father John Cassian, depicted the apathetic restlessness of acedia, "the noonday demon", in the cenobitic monk:

He looks about anxiously this way and that, and sighs that none of the brethren come to see him, and often goes in and out of his cell, and frequently gazes up at the sun, as if it was too slow in setting, and so a kind of unreasonable confusion of mind takes possession of him like some foul darkness.

In the medieval Latin tradition of the seven deadly sins, acedia has generally been folded into the sin of sloth. The Benedictine Rule directed that a monk displaying the outward signs of acedia should:

be reproved a first and a second time. If he does not amend he must be subjected to the punishment of the rule so that the others may have fear.

== The Middle Ages ==
According to the Oxford Concise Dictionary of the Christian Church "by the early 5th cent., the word had become a technical term in Christian asceticism, signifying a state of restlessness and inability either to work or to pray." Not only monks and theologians spoke of the vice, but it appears in the writings of laymen, as well. It appears in Dante's Divine Comedy not only as a sin to be punished in the damned, but also as the sin that leads Dante to the edge of Hell to begin with. Chaucer's parson includes acedia in his list of vices. It follows anger and envy in the list and the parson connects the three vices together:

For Envye blindeth the herte of a man, and Ire troubleth a man; and Accidie maketh him hevy, thoghtful, and wrawe. / Envye and Ire maken bitternesse in herte; which bitternesse is moder of Accidie, and binimeth him the love of alle goodnesse.

In his sustained analysis of the vice in Q. 35 of the Second Part (Secunda Secundae) of his Summa Theologica, 13th-century theologian Thomas Aquinas identifies acedia with "the sorrow of the world" (compare Weltschmerz) that "worketh death" and contrasts it with that sorrow "according to God" described by St. Paul in 2 Cor. 7:10. For Aquinas, acedia is "sorrow about spiritual good in as much as it is a Divine good." It becomes a mortal sin when reason consents to man's "flight" (fuga) from the Divine good, "on account of the flesh utterly prevailing over the spirit." Acedia is essentially a flight from the divine that leads to not even caring that one does not care. The ultimate expression of this is a despair that ends in suicide.

Aquinas's teaching on acedia in Q. 35 contrasts with his prior teaching on charity's gifted "spiritual joy", to which acedia is directly opposed, and which he explores in Q. 28 of the Secunda Secundae. As Aquinas says, "One opposite is known through the other, as darkness through light. Hence also what evil is must be known from the nature of good."

== Modern revival ==
The term acedia had all but died out in common usage by the beginning of the 20th century. "In the 1933 Oxford English Dictionary, accidie was confidently declared obsolete, with references dating from 1520 and 1730. But by the mid-20th century, as people were contending with the two world wars, accidie was back in use." No longer the exclusive property of theologians, the word appears in the writings of Aldous Huxley and Ian Fleming.

== Signs ==
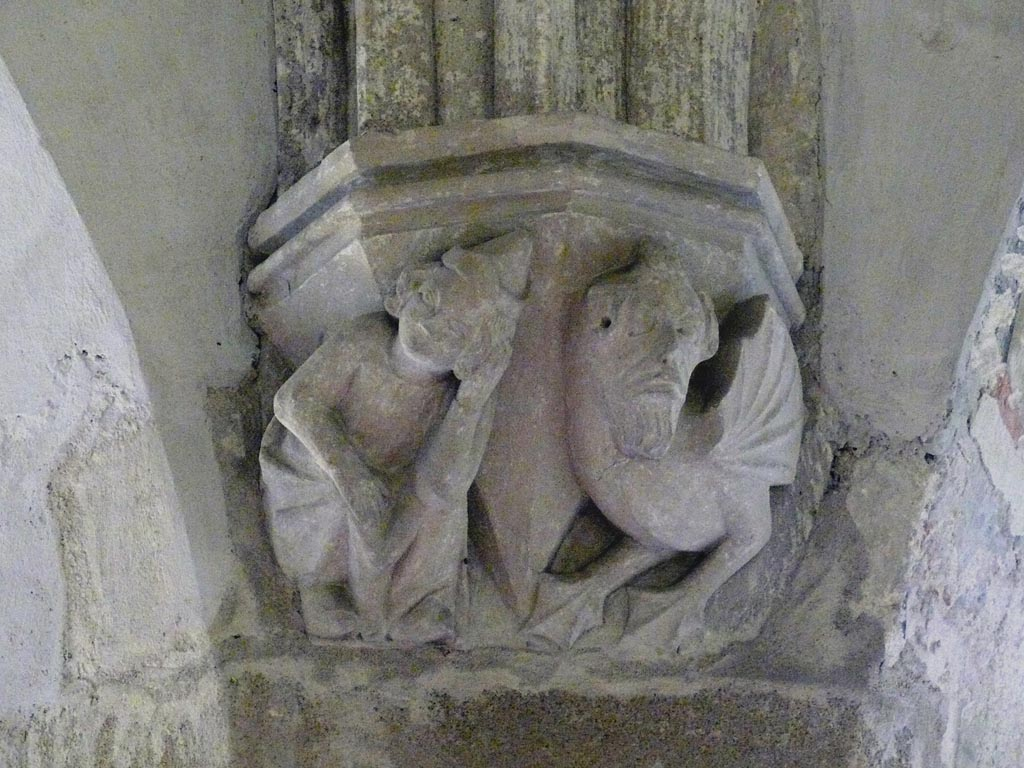
Acedia is depicted as a sleeping man and a bat in the Goat Church in Sopron, Hungary.

Acedia is indicated by a range of signs (or symptoms), which are typically divided into two basic categories: somatic and psychological. Somatic (physical) symptoms range from mere sleepiness to general "sickness, debility, weakening of the knees, and all the members" (in a description attributed to the fifth-century Theodora of Alexandria by 21st-century author Laura Swan). A host of psychological symptoms can also signify the presence of acedia, which affects the mental state and behavior of the afflicted. Some commonly reported psychological signs revolve around a lack of attention to daily tasks and an overall dissatisfaction with life. The best-known of the psychological signs of acedia is tedium, boredom, or general laziness. Author Kathleen Norris in her book Acedia and Me asserts that dictionary definitions such as "torpor" and "sloth" fail to do justice to this temptation; she believes a state of restlessness, of not living in the present and seeing the future as overwhelming is more accurate a definition than straight laziness: it is especially present in monasteries, due to the cutting off of distractions, but can invade any vocation where the labor is long, the rewards slow to appear, such as scientific research, long term marriages, etc. Another sign is a lack of caring, of being unfeeling about things, whether that be your appearance, hygiene, your relationships, your community's welfare, the world's welfare, etc.; all of this, Norris relates, is connected to the hopelessness and vague unease that arises from having too many choices, lacking true commitment, of being "a slave from within". She relates this to forgetfulness about "the one thing needful": remembrance of God.

== In culture ==
- Acedia plays an important role in the literary criticism of Walter Benjamin. In his study of baroque literature, The Origin of German Tragic Drama, Benjamin describes acedia as a moral failing, an "indolence of the heart" that ruins great men. Benjamin considers acedia to be a key feature of many baroque tragic heroes, from the minor dramatic figures of German tragedy to Shakespeare's Hamlet: "The indecisiveness of the prince, in particular, is nothing other than saturnine acedia." It is this slothful inability to make decisions that leads baroque tragic heroes to passively accept their fate, rather than resisting it in the heroic manner of classical tragedy.
- Roger Fry saw acedia or gloominess as a 20th-century peril to be fought by a mixture of work and of determined pleasure in life.
- Anton Chekhov and Samuel Beckett's plays often have themes of acedia.
- Aldous Huxley wrote an essay on acedia called "Accidie". A non-Christian, he examines "the noon day demons" original delineation by the Desert Fathers, and concludes that it is one of the main diseases of the modern age.
- Writer David J. Cord claimed acedia can even affect an entire organization, and in The Decline and Fall of Nokia cites a culture of acedia as a prime cause for the collapse of Nokia's mobile device unit.
- The Manic Street Preachers song "Of Walking Abortion", which appears on their 1994 album The Holy Bible, refers in its lyrics to "acedia's blackest hole". Both the song and the album on which it appears explore themes of nihilism, despair, and mental illness.

== See also ==
- Aboulia
- Aergia – Greek goddess personifying sloth
- Anhedonia
- Anomie
- Apathy
- Cabin fever
- Disorders of diminished motivation
- Identity crisis
- Joie de vivre
- Koyaanisqatsi
- Lethargy
- Noonday Demon
- Sloth (deadly sin)
- Weltschmerz

== General bibliography ==
- Alcock, A. (2019). "The Eight Spirits of Evil by Evagrius of Pontus". Research Gate.
- Norris, K. (2008). Acedia & Me. New York: Riverhead Books. ISBN 9781594489969
- Ward, B. (1975). The Sayings of the Desert Fathers. Kalamazoo: Cistercian Publications. ISBN 9780879079598
