= Sloth (deadly sin) =

One of the deadly sins, mainly focuses on laziness or apathy

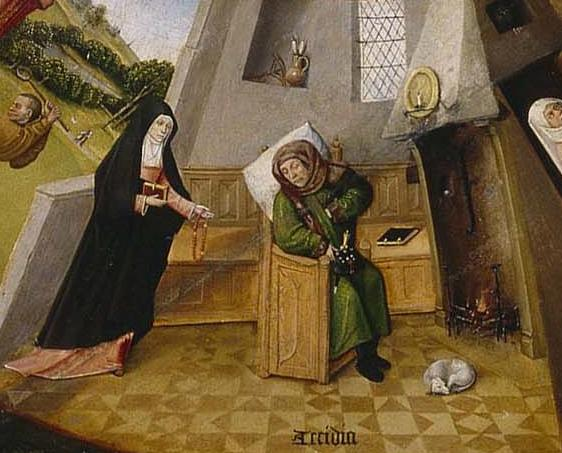
Acedia in The Seven Deadly Sins and the Four Last Things, by Hieronymus Bosch.

Sloth is one of the seven deadly sins in Catholic teachings. It is the most difficult of the seven deadly sins to define and credit as sin, since it refers to an assortment of ideas, dating from antiquity and including mental, spiritual, pathological, and conditional states. One definition is a habitual disinclination to exertion, or laziness. Views concerning the virtue of work to support society and further God's plan suggest that through inactivity, one invites sin: "For Satan finds some mischief still for idle hands to do." ("Against Idleness and Mischief" by Isaac Watts).

== Definition ==
The word "sloth" is a translation of the Latin term acedia (Middle English, acciditties) and means "without care". Spiritually, acedia first referred to an affliction to women, religious persons, wherein they became indifferent to their duties and obligations to God. Mentally, acedia has a number of distinctive components of which the most important is affectlessness, a lack of any feeling about self or others, a mind-state that gives rise to boredom, rancor, apathy, and a passive, inert, or sluggish mentation. Physically, acedia is fundamentally a cessation of motion and an indifference to work; it finds expression in laziness, idleness, and indolence. Two commentators consider the most accurate translation of acedia to be "self-pity", for it "conveys both the melancholy of the condition and self-centeredness upon which it is founded."

=== Catholicism ===
In his Summa Theologica, Saint Thomas Aquinas defined sloth as "sorrow about spiritual good" and as "facetiousness of the mind which neglects to being good... [it] is evil in its effect, if it so oppresses men as to draw him away entirely from good deeds." According to the Catechism of the Catholic Church, "acedia or sloth goes so far as to refuse joy from God and is repelled by goodness".

Sloth is not the seven gifts of grace given by the Holy Ghost (wisdom, understanding, counsel, knowledge, piety, fortitude, and fear of the Lord); such disregard slows spiritual progress towards life—to neglect manifold duties of charity towards the neighbour, and animosity towards God.

Unlike the other capital sins, sloth is a sin of omission, being a lack of desire and/or performance. It may arise from any of the other capital vices; for example, a son may omit his duty to his father through anger. Henry Edward Manning argued that while the state and habit of sloth is a mortal sin, the habit of the soul tending towards the last mortal state of sloth is not mortal in and of itself except under certain circumstances.

Italian poet Dante Alighieri contemplates the nature of sloth as a capital vice in Canto 18 of Purgatorio, the second canticle of the Divine Comedy. Dante encounters the slothful on the fourth terrace of Mount Purgatory, where his guide, the Roman poet Virgil, explains that sloth can be seen as the effect of an insufficient amount of love. Following the logics of contrapasso, the slothful work to purge themselves of their vice through continuous running after good.

=== Orthodoxy ===
In the Philokalia, the word dejection is used instead of sloth, for the person who falls into dejection will lose interest in life.

=== Others ===
Sloth has also been defined as a failure to do things that one should do, though the understanding of the sin in antiquity was that this laziness or lack of work was simply a symptom of the vice of apathy or indifference, particularly an apathy or boredom with God. Concurrently, this apathy can be seen as an inadequate amount of love.

Emotionally and cognitively, the evil of acedia finds expression in a lack of any feeling for the world, for the people in it, or for the self. Acedia takes form as an alienation of the sentient self first from the world and then from itself. Although the most profound versions of this condition are found in a withdrawal from all forms of participation in or care for others or oneself, a lesser but more noisome element was also noted by theologians. From tristitia, asserted Gregory the Great, "there arise malice, rancour, cowardice, [and] despair..." Geoffrey Chaucer, too, dealt with this attribute of acedia, counting the characteristics of the sin to include despair, somnolence, idleness, tardiness, negligence, indolence, and wrawnesse, the last variously translated as "anger" or better as "peevishness". For Chaucer, human's sin consists of languishing and holding back, refusing to undertake works of goodness because, he/she tells him/her self, the circumstances surrounding the establishment of good are too grievous and too difficult to suffer. Acedia in Chaucer's view is thus the enemy of every source and motive for work.

Sloth not only subverts the livelihood of the body, taking no care for its day-to-day provisions but also slows down the mind, halting its attention to matters of great importance. Sloth hinders man in his righteous undertakings and becomes a path to ruin.

According to Peter Binsfeld's Binsfeld's Classification of Demons, Belphegor is the chief demon of the sin Sloth.

Christian author and Clinical Psychologist Dr. William Backus has pointed out the similarities between sloth and depression. "Depression involves aversion to effort, and the moral danger of sloth lies in this characteristic. The work involved in exercising one's will to make moral and spiritual decisions seems particularly undesirable and demanding. Thus the slothful person drifts along in habits of sin, convinced that he has no willpower and aided in this claim by those who persist in seeking only biological and environmental causes and medical remedies for sloth."

== See also ==
- Acedia
- Apathy
- Goofing off
- Ignorance
- Irreligion
- Laziness
- Melancholy
- Noonday Demon
- Slacker
- Torpor
- Procrastination
- Seven deadly sins
  Lust
  Gluttony
  Greed
  Sloth
  Wrath
  Envy
  Pride
- Seven heavenly virtues
  Chastity
  Temperance
  Charity
  Diligence
  Patience
  Kindness
  Humility

== Bibliography ==
- Aquinas, Thomas (1265). "Second Part of the Second Part (Question 35: Sloth)" . Summa Theologica. Benzinger Brothers.
- de la Puente, Lius (1852). "Meditation XXIV. (On Sloth)" . Meditations On The Mysteries Of Our Holy Faith. Richarson and Son.
- Delany, Joseph Francis (1912). "Sloth" . In Herbermann, Charles (ed.). Catholic Encyclopedia. Vol. 14. New York: Robert Appleton Company.
- Bible, English Standard Version Revised, 1971, Biblegateway.com, http://www.biblegateway.com/
- Thomas Pynchon: The Deadly Sins/Sloth; Nearer, My Couch, to Thee, New York Times, June 6, 1993
- Lectura Dantis: Purgatorio, ed. Allen Mandelbaulm, University of California Press, 2008
- Purgatorio, Dante Alighieri, transl. Robert M. Durling, Oxford University Press, 2004
- Scupoli, Lorenzo (1875). "How to Overcome Sloth" . The Spiritual Combat, together with the supplement and The path of Paradise. Rivingtons.
