= Barcelona Principles =

Research principles in public relations

The Barcelona Principles refers to the Barcelona Declaration of Research Principles, a set of seven voluntary guidelines established by the public relations (PR) industry to measure the efficiency of PR campaigns. They were the first overreaching framework for effective public relations and communications measurement. The Principles serve as a guide for practitioners to incorporate the ever-expanding media landscape into a transparent, reliable, and consistent framework.

The Barcelona Principles were agreed upon by PR practitioners from 33 countries who met in Barcelona, Spain in 2010 for a summit convened by the International Association for Measurement and Evaluation of Communication (AMEC). The Barcelona Principles identify the need for outcome-, instead of output-, based measurement of PR campaigns, call for the exclusion of ad value equivalency metrics, and recognize the communications value of social media.

== Original 2010 Principles ==
The original Barcelona Principles were listed as follows:

1. Importance of goal setting and measurement
2. Measuring the effect on outcomes is preferred to measuring outputs
3. The effect on business results can and should be measured where possible
4. Media measurements requires quantity and quality
5. AVEs are not the value of Public Relations
6. Social Media can and should be measured
7. Transparency and replicability are paramount to sound measurement

== Barcelona Principles 2.0 (2015) ==
These principles were updated in 2015:

1. Goal setting and measurement are fundamental to communication and public relations: A holistic approach that includes traditional and social media; keeping aware of changes in variables. Making goals qualitative and quantitative as well as integrating SMART criteria evaluation across all channels
2. Measuring communication outcomes is recommended versus only measuring outputs: Applying standards best practices in target audience research
3. The effect on organizational performance can and should be measured where possible: Demand for models to evaluate the impact on target audiences and survey research (ex. Profitability, customer quality, revenue, market share, and customer retention)
4. Measurement and evaluation require both qualitative and quantitative methods: Measuring impressions among stakeholders, target audience, and the quality of media coverage. Measuring positive, negative, and neutral progress not only success
5. AVEs are not the value of communication. ¬ Instead use negotiated advertising rates relevant to the client, quality of coverage, and physical space or time of the coverage related to the portion of the coverage that is relevant
6. Social media can and should be measured consistently with other media channels. ¬ Focus measurement on engagement, “conversation” and “communities”, not just “coverage” or vanity metrics
7. Measurement and evaluation should be transparent, consistent and valid. ¬ Ensure integrity, honesty, openness, and ethical practices. Recognize and potential biasing effects in the research itself, or broader societal context

== Barcelona Principles 2.0 ==
In 2015 industry leaders and the original developers gathered together to modify the original principles in order to make them more reflective of the current communication industry, as the original Barcelona Principles were "never intended to be a final or complete solution.” The goal of the working group was to ensure that the Barcelona Principles could continue to act as a baseline for professionals.

The original Barcelona Principles were predominantly focused on “what not to do” and were created with the public relations industry in mind. Its quantitative methods outweighed qualitative methods and due to a constantly changing industry, standards needed to continuously evolve in order to accurately measure effectiveness.

The modified principles were based on results accumulated from a wide array of communication agencies, organizations, and practitioners over the past five years of applied standards. Modifications included learnings that can be applied with a focus on, “what to do” instead of, “what not to do”. The Barcelona Principles 2.0 integrated all communication field measurement that now reflect the importance of evaluation, insight, and qualitative methods.

== Barcelona Principles 3.0 (2020) ==
These principles were updated again in 2020:

1. Setting goals is an absolute prerequisite to communications planning, measurement, and evaluation
2. Measurement and evaluation should identify outputs, outcomes, and potential impact
3. Outcomes and impact should be identified for stakeholders, society, and the organization
4. Communication measurement and evaluation should include both qualitative and quantitative analysis
5. AVEs are not the value of communication
6. Holistic communication measurement and evaluation includes all relevant online and offline channels
7. Communication measurement and evaluation are rooted in integrity and transparency to drive learning and insights

== Barcelona Principles 3.0 ==
As public relations and communication practices have evolved, so too has the approach to measuring and evaluating the sector's performance. In 2020, the International Association for Measurement and Evaluation of Communication (AMEC) organised a committee of industry experts to review, update and evolve the Barcelona Principles. The committee, led by Dr David Rockland, sought to adapt the principles to "sharpen the communications industry's focus on inclusion, impact, and integrity." Barcelona Principles 3.0, which were launched at AMEC's 2020 Virtual Summit, acknowledges that common practices in 2010 – even 2015 – may now be outdated. Furthermore, the updated Principles have broadened its relevance to a wider and more diverse range of organizations and roles to reflect that measurement and evaluation best practice is equally essential in government communications, charities, NGOs, and other non-commercial entities.

As such, the Principles now reflect a broader standard of measurement, focused heavily on measuring what matters to drive continuous improvement within an organization rather than solely attempting to prove the value of public relations and communications. And, with social and digital measurement now a table-stake in the sector, the Principles reflect a more holistic approach that standardizes measurement across all channels, with an eye toward allowing choice in where to invest in public relations and communications to drive optimal organizational performance.
