= Judith F. Kroll =

American psychologist

- Occupations: Professor of Psychology, Linguistics, and Women's Studies
- Spouse: David A. Rosenbaum

Academic background
- Education: New York University; Brandeis University

Academic work
- Institutions: University of California, Riverside; Pennsylvania State University

Judith F. Kroll is an American psychologist who is a Distinguished Professor of Education at University of California, Irvine. She specializes in psycholinguistics, focusing on second language acquisition and bilingual language processing. With Randi Martin and Suparna Rajaram, Kroll co-founded the organization Women in Cognitive Science in 2001. She is a Fellow of the American Association for the Advancement of Science (AAAS), the American Psychological Association (APA), the Psychonomic Society, the Society of Experimental Psychologists, and the Association for Psychological Science (APS).

== Biography ==
Judith Kroll received an A.B. (1970) in Psychology with a minor in Mathematics from New York University. She completed an M.A. (1972) and PhD (1977) in Cognitive Psychology at Brandeis University, supervised by Maurice Hershenson. Kroll held faculty positions at Swarthmore College (1977-1978), Rutgers University (1978-1981) and Mount Holyoke College (1981-1994), prior to moving to Pennsylvania State University (1994-2016), where she directed the Center for Language Science. Kroll moved her lab to University of California, Riverside (UCR) in 2016 and then to University of California, Irvine (UCI) in 2019. With colleagues from UCR and Penn State, she is Co-Principal Investigator of a Partnerships for International Research and Education (PIRE) grant to provide training for language scientists to pursue research on bilingualism. Kroll is married to David A. Rosenbaum, a professor of psychology at UCR.

== Research ==
Kroll's research program examines the cognitive processes underlying bilingualism. Her research has been supported by The National Science Foundation (NSF) and The National Institutes of Health (NIH). With Annette de Groot, she co-edited the Handbook of Bilingualism: Psycholinguistic Approaches. In 2013, Kroll was awarded a Guggenheim Fellowship to conduct research exploring how learning a second language and becoming a bilingual person impacts processing of one's native language.

One of Kroll's research foci has to do with language selection in bilingual speech. She discovered that when one language is spoken, both languages are active.

== Select publications ==
- Kroll, J. F., & Bialystok, E. (2013). Understanding the consequences of bilingualism for language processing and cognition. Journal of Cognitive Psychology, 25(5), 497–514.
- Kroll, J. F., Bobb, S. C., & Wodniecka, Z. (2006). Language selectivity is the exception, not the rule: Arguments against a fixed locus of language selection in bilingual speech. Bilingualism: Language and Cognition, 9(2), 119–135.
- Kroll, J. F., Michael, E., Tokowicz, N., & Dufour, R. (2002). The development of lexical fluency in a second language. Second language Research, 18(2), 137–171.
- Kroll, J. F., & Potter, M. C. (1984). Recognizing words, pictures, and concepts: A comparison of lexical, object, and reality decisions. Journal of Memory and Language, 23(1), 39–66.
- Kroll, J. F., & Stewart, E. (1994). Category interference in translation and picture naming: Evidence for asymmetric connections between bilingual memory representations. Journal of Memory and Language, 33(2), 149–174.
