= Adversarial collaboration =

Method of research

In science, adversarial collaboration is a modality of collaboration wherein opposing views work together in order to jointly advance knowledge of the area under dispute. This can take the form of a scientific experiment conducted by two groups of experimenters with competing hypotheses, with the aim of constructing and implementing an experimental design in a way that satisfies both groups that there are no obvious biases or weaknesses in the experimental design. Adversarial collaboration can involve a neutral moderator and lead to a co-designed experiment and joint publishing of findings in order to resolve differences. With its emphasis on transparency throughout the research process, adversarial collaboration has been described as sitting within the open science framework.

== History ==
One of the earliest modern examples of adversarial collaboration was a 1988 collaboration between Erez and Latham with Edwin Locke working as a neutral third party. This collaboration came about as the result of a disagreement from the field of Goal-Setting research between Erez and Latham on an aspect of goal-setting research around the effect of participation on goal commitment and performance. Latham and Erez designed four experiments which explained the differences between their individual findings, but did not coin the term adversarial collaboration. Independently, to Erez, Locke and Latham whose work he was unaware of, Daniel Kahneman developed a similar protocol for adversarial collaboration around ten years later and may have been the first to use the term adversarial collaboration. More recently, Clark and Tetlock have proposed adversarial collaboration as a vehicle for improving how science can self-correct through exploring rival hypotheses which will ultimately expose false claims. Their work has led to the University of Pennsylvania School of Arts & Sciences creating the Adversarial Collaboration Project which seeks to encourage the use of adversarial collaboration as a research approach to address a variety of research questions.

== Benefits ==
Adversarial collaboration has been recommended by Daniel Kahneman and others as a way of reducing the distorting impact of cognitive-motivational biases on human reasoning and resolving contentious issues in fringe science. It has also been recommended as a potential solution for improving academic commentaries.

Philip Tetlock and Gregory Mitchell have discussed it in various articles. They argue:

Adversarial collaboration is most feasible when least needed: when the clashing camps have advanced testable theories, subscribe to common canons for testing those theories, and disagreements are robust but respectful. And adversarial collaboration is least feasible when most needed: when the scientific community lacks clear criteria for falsifying points of view, disagrees on key methodological issues, relies on second- or third-best substitute methods for testing causality, and is fractured into opposing camps that engage in ad hominem posturing and that have intimate ties to political actors who see any concession as weakness.
