= Precrastination =

Habitual of completing tasks as soon as possible

Precrastination, defined as the act of completing tasks immediately, often at the expense of increased effort or diminished quality of outcomes, is a phenomenon observed in certain individuals. This approach is often adopted to avoid the anxiety and stress associated with last-minute work and procrastination. Precrastination may be an unhealthy behavior pattern and is accompanied by symptoms such as conscientiousness, eagerness to please, and high energy.

People who precrastinate may try to find shortcuts to be more efficient and productive, but this may result in the application of non-effective energy management and cause the person to fulfill their tasks to an incomplete or insufficient degree. Precrastinators may be more likely to act impulsively instead of carefully planning ahead.

== Etymology ==
The word precrastination is a blend of pre- 'before' and -crastinus 'until next day'.

It is most likely a play on the word procrastination, which has an opposite definition.

== Research ==
Rosenbaum et al. coined the term precrastination in 2014. David A. Rosenbaum is a professor in the Department of Psychology at the University of California, Riverside. The study found evidence of human precrastination.

=== The bucket experiments ===
The paper titled "Pre-crastination: Hastening Subgoal Completion at the Expense of Extra Physical Effort" consisted of nine different experiments that can be termed the bucket experiments. The goal of the research was "to get a better understanding of the evaluation of different kinds of costs in action planning". While confirming the belief that individuals would rather carry a load weight a shorter distance rather than an equally heavy load of weight a longer distance they found contradictory results. Most university students irrationally carried the closer bucket over a long distance, rather than the further bucket over a short distance to the endpoint. When interviewed, the participants answered that they wanted to "get the task done as quickly as possible". These surprising results from the first three experiments changed the goal of research to "describing and providing a theoretical interpretation of this astonishing phenomenon".

==== First three experiments ====
The bucket experiments were conducted using Pennsylvania State University students as participants and started with a set of three experiments that involved having a participant walk down an alleyway and from there pick up one of two weighted buckets and carry it a distance further until a stop line. Contrary to the experimenters' expectations, participants would rather pick up and carry the bucket that was closer to them than pick up the bucket closer to the stop line, meaning that the participant would expend more energy to complete the task than necessary. When participants were questioned about their choice, they expressed the sentiment of wanting to get the task done as soon as possible.

==== Testing the new phenomenon ====
The fourth experiment was used to confirm the finding of the previous three while reducing statistical variability by moving the starting position of the buckets 6 ft (1.8 m) further from the participants. Previous results were upheld and the statistical variability for the conclusion of the approach distance being the primary factor for picking up the bucket from the left or right was also upheld.

The fifth and sixth experiments were used to remove the aspect of foot–hand coordination from the task; this was done by placing the participants in wheelchairs while they completed the task. The results from this experiment were in line with the rest of the experiments.

In experiment seven, the researchers investigated "the possibility that participants actually preferred long carrying distances to short carrying distances". This was done by altering the total distance that a left or right bucket would need to be carried, rather than just altering the approach and carry distances of the buckets. The result of this experiment was that the theory that participants preferred long carrying distances was not supported and that the students still cared about the total distance of the task (approach + carrying distance), suggesting that when deciding task methodology, both approach and total distance are considered.

For the eighth experiment, the experimenters tested the hypothesis that "participants may have been attracted to the nearer object, grabbing it without considering the farther object because their attention was grabbed by the object that was closer at hand". This attention hypothesis was tested by placing a screen at the end of the alleyway that told the participants to wait before starting the task, this could be for a two or four-second interval. After this an okay message would appear and the participants could complete the task at their leisure. The researchers argue that the screen "was to get participants to look down the alley so they would see the far as well as the near bucket." and that their rationale for showing the wait message "was to discourage participants from impulsively initiating their excursion into the alley". Ultimately there were no significant deviations from the results of the previous experiments, meaning that the close-object preference was replicated.

Finally, the ninth experiment was to confirm that there was a noticeable difference in physical exertion between the two options for carrying distances and that the more labor-intensive option would be avoided. This was done by having light and heavy bucket options for the task while repeating the setup of experiments one through three. The results from experiment nine confirmed a general preference for the lighter bucket, thereby confirming to the researchers that exertion did matter to participants, and despite this would engage in close-object preference when performing the other experiments—even when it would result in a longer carrying distance, and thereby more exertion.

=== Further research ===
==== Sequencing preferences ====
In April 2018 Lisa R. Fournier, Alexandra M. Stubblefield, Brian P. Dyre, and David A. Rosenbaum published a research article titled "Starting or finishing sooner? Sequencing preferences in object transfer tasks". This article examined task sequencing in regard to object-transferring tasks in which either of two possible tasks could easily or logically come before the other task. This was done in hopes of determining whether precrastination would generalize a consistent logic of which of the two tasks to do first.

For the experiment, they tested various conditions that differed in regard to "which task can be started sooner, finished sooner, or bring one's current state closer to the goal state". The testing of the experiment was to have participants transfer ping pong balls from two original buckets, one bucket at a time, into a bowl that was placed at the end of a corridor. The number of balls in the buckets, as well as the bucket distances along the corridor, differed between trials. An important factor for this experiment is the fact that the bucket selection didn't affect the total time to complete both of the transport tasks together. Also, participants walked, in grand total, an equal total distance and carried the buckets the same total distance regardless of which bucket was originally chosen.

The experiment's conclusion was that "We found that the chosen task order was strongly affected by which task or sub-goal could be started sooner", thus replicating the tendency to engage in precrastination that was first observed in 2014 Rosenbaum et al. The end conclusion of the article differed from the 2014 Rosenbaum study by stating that, instead of precrastination being fueled by the wish to complete sub-goals as quickly as possible, precrastination is more likely the result of the desire to initiate the sub-goals as soon as possible.

==== Precrastination and cognitive load ====
On November 30 2018, Lisa R. Fournier, Emily Coder, Clark Kogan, Nisha Raghunath, Ezana Taddese, and David A. Rosenbaum published a research article titled "Which task will we choose first? Precrastination and cognitive load in task ordering". The article "examined the generality of this recently discovered phenomenon by extending the methods used to study it, mainly to test the hypothesis that precrastination is motivated by cognitive load reduction."

The researchers experimented using the basic experimental setup from the bucket experiments, with a few alterations. One, instead of participants having to pick up and carry one of two possible buckets along a corridor, participants in this set of experiments were instructed to pick up both buckets that were placed in the workspace. Two, the participants had to carry both buckets at the same time in order to complete the task. Due to the task requiring the participants to pass by the location of the first bucket twice, once while walking to the second bucket and once more while walking back toward the end goal, it was determined that the action of picking up the first bucket on the first walk constituted a display of precrastination. Three, the addition of having half the participants memorize digit lists on top of performing the base physical action task mentioned previously. Four, the experiment was broken into two separate experiments. In the first experiment, the objects to be carried were buckets with golf balls, with possible variations of the number of golf balls in the near bucket versus the far bucket. In the second experiment, the objects to be carried were cups that were either full or half-full of water.

The conclusion of the research is split into two parts. For experiment one, the researchers had the following statement: "The results of Experiment 1 showed that precrastination generalizes to the ordering of tasks (or task subgoals)." This resulted in another finding that replicates and extends the original findings of Rosenbaum et al. from 2014. The extension is seen with the findings that participants with a memory load showed a high probability of selecting the near bucket first—which was not the case for participants without a memory load. This means that while previous research is upheld, there is additional support to the claim that precrastination is the result of cognitive load reduction.

Regarding the results of experiment two, the researchers stated: "Participants in the water cup transport task largely abandoned the near-object-first preference". They believe this was the result of the participants having to "pay a great deal of extra attention to the task if they started with the near cup". This interpretation supports the hypothesis that precrastination is the result of a reduction of cognitive load—when cognitive load would be increased as a result of engaging in precrastination, precrastination does not occur.

==== End-state comfort and precrastination ====
In January 2019, David A. Rosenbaum and Kyle S. Sauerberger published the research paper "End-state comfort meets pre-crastination", with the goal of resolving an apparent conflict between the observed phenomena of precrastination and end-state comfort. End-state comfort can generally be defined as the tendency to act in physically awkward ways for the sake of comfortable or easy-to-control final postures. Through the course of the paper, the researchers determine that the two phenomena are in fact not contradictory and can interplay between them, to determine the end course of action.

=== Studying precrastination in animals ===
Precrastination has also been observed in animal behavior, as evidenced by Edward A. Wasserman and Stephen J. Brzykcy's 2014 paper "Pre-crastination in the pigeon".

In order to test the possibility of pigeons displaying precrastination, the researchers devised a basic two-alternative forced-choice task, where the pigeons had to at one time or another switch from pecking the center of three horizontally aligned buttons to pecking one of two side buttons. For the differing trials left or right was cued by red or green colors. The pigeons' center-to-side button switch could be completed sooner (in the second step) or later (in the third step) in the sequence, with the difference between these two sequences resulting in no effect on the effort required to complete the task, the distance traveled over the course of the task, or the reward received from the task.

As a result of this experiment, the researchers determined that pigeons displayed precrastination. This is due to the fact that despite the lack of any difference in the reward given for doing so, all of the pigeons "quickly came to peck the side location in Step 2 on which the upcoming star would next be presented in Step 3".

== Explanations ==
=== Evolutionary perspective ===
Precrastination often involves hasty and sudden behavior as well as split-second decision-making. Evolution played an important role in making precrastination the "default response option" as animals' quick reactions and decisions might have been significant to their survival. The brain evolved to anticipate certain situations and to approach the situation in an appropriate way. Subsequently, the adapted brains' ability to adjust and adapt to different contexts in rapid manner and within a short timeframe allowed certain animals to have an advantage over others. Wasserman and Brzykcy's 2014 pigeon study showed further evidence that precrastination can be explained by evolution and indicated that pigeons precrastinate. As the evolutionary ancestors of pigeons and humans went separate ways 300 billion years ago, it supports the evolutionary theory that the tendency to precrastinate may have emerged from a common ancestor. The suggestions why common ancestors should precrastinate can be linked to survival as well. Grabbing the lowest fruit from the tree, eating the grain while it is still nearby, and getting food while it is still available can be crucial for survival.

=== Working memory off-loading perspective ===
An alternative explanation for precrastination is related to decreasing the load on one's working memory. When a task is done immediately, it can be mentally checked off and does not need to be stored in one's working memory anymore. In contrast, when waiting to do a task, the task-related information needs to be continuously remembered which can be taxing for one's working memory. Working memory is defined as the active manipulation and maintenance of short-term memory. In contrast to long-term memory, it has a limited capacity of about five to nine units and is readily accessible. In accordance to the limited capacity, Dr. Rosenbaum hypothesized that in order to off-load items stored within the working memory, people will try and complete certain tasks, even if this is at the expense of more physical effort. Further evidence for this perspective is shown in an experiment done by Lisa Fournier and co-authors in 2018. A similar task to the bucket experiments was given to participants; however, half of the participants were given an extra mental load to maintain while completing the task. This extra mental load was in the form of remembering a list of numbers that they had to recall after the task was completed. Recalling the list of numbers specifically targeted increases the mental load of the working memory of the participants. Dr. Fournier found that the participants with the extra mental load were ninety percent more likely to precrastinate during the task. It shows that people tend to structure their behavior in ways that decrease personal cognitive effort, which supports the idea of a trade-off between physical effort and cognitive load. In order to reduce the cognitive load, people are willing to put in extra physical effort. This suboptimal behavior is found within the Bucket Experiments. Individuals often chose to carry the closest bucket first, despite the fact that such action results in an increased physical effort required for competition of the task. One critique to this theory is that lifting a bucket does not tax the working memory that much, so it is not clear if this is the only thing that is contributing to precrastination.

==== CLEAR hypothesis ====
The working memory off-loading perspective was expanded on by the cognitive-load reduction (CLEAR) hypothesis created by Rachel VonderHaar and coauthors in 2019. The hypothesis is aimed at explaining how the completion of tasks is ordered mentally. According to the CLEAR hypothesis, there is a strong drive to reduce cognitive load; therefore, tasks that are most efficient in doing so will be prioritized. This hypothesis takes a broader view of the cognitive load of a task and suggests that people will do what they can to free up cognitive resources. The study by VonderHaar et al. in 2019 specifically showed that when given the choice in what order to perform two different tasks, one being a physical task and the other being a cognitive task, participants were more likely to choose to undertake the cognitive task before the physical one. The CLEAR hypothesis includes off-loading working memory as well as freeing up other cognitive resources such as attention. This is illustrated by a study conducted by Raghunath et al. about precrastination and attention. The setup was similar to that of the bucket experiment, but then with half-full or full cups of water. The cup experiment showed that precrastination is dependent on the cognitive demands of the tasks. When the full cup of water was placed earlier and the half-cup later on, precrastination decreased as the full cup required more attention. This showed that when an earlier task requires more attention than a later one, the prevalence of precrastination decreases. The same was not seen when the weight of the buckets was adjusted. While precrastinating would increase physical effort even more, participants still choose to do so. People who always precrastinated in the cup experiment even when the cognitive load was higher mentioned that they did so out of habit.

=== Reward perspective ===
A simpler perspective is related to the rewards associated with completing a task. The reward center in the brain is activated when a task is completed that required less effort. The perspective suggests that individuals will perform tasks earlier as it is rewarded in the brain. Tasks that are completed earlier are more attractive, as this results in an instant reward. However, when a task requires a delay, this also delays the reward.

== Consequences ==
As of 2022, not a lot is known about the positive and negative effects of precrastination. A possible positive effect derived from precrastinating is that one may relieve one's working memory by accomplishing a task as soon as possible, thus making cognitive space for more important decisions. Another positive consequence may be that one is able to gain a lot of information as quickly as possible about the costs and benefits of task-related behaviors. Completing a task right away also enables an instant sense of accomplishment. However, precrastination can also lead to negative consequences due to behaving in an overall less efficient or irrational way. Making a rushed decision can also lead to completing a task incorrectly.

== Correlates ==
Precrastination has been associated with different character traits. Impulsivity was expected to be among them because it has been evidenced to be a strong correlate of the contrary concept of procrastination. Results provided by the research of Sauerberger et al. showed that this trait might be unrelated to precrastination. In his published dissertation, further correlates were listed that have been found throughout studies of his research team. A negative correlation has been established between the trait of clumsiness and precrastination. Three of the Big Five personality traits have been investigated in more detail– conscientiousness, neuroticism, and agreeableness.

=== Conscientiousness, neuroticism and agreeableness ===
Conscientiousness has been shown to be positively associated with precrastination. Organization, responsibility, and productiveness are characteristics of it according to the big five inventory. Ego resilience, which resembles conscientiousness in many aspects, is also positively correlated to precrastination. Another trait is neuroticism, for which the results showed no significant correlation. Depression, which is one of its features in the Big Five inventory next to anxiety and emotionality, has the strongest correlation with precrastination. Sauerberger stated that no observable correlation with neuroticism might be due to other factors, such as the participants' awareness of no consequence following their action and no feeling of uncertainty involved in the experiments as seen in real-life situations. He commented that there might be a correlation. A correlation with agreeableness has been proven. The relationship might be either positive or negative depending on the context, for example giving precrastinators exhibit less prosocial behavior on planes but increased prosocial behavior on the freeway. According to the Big Five inventory, the main facets of this trait are compassion, respect, and trust.
