= Edwin Locke =

American psychologist (b.1938)

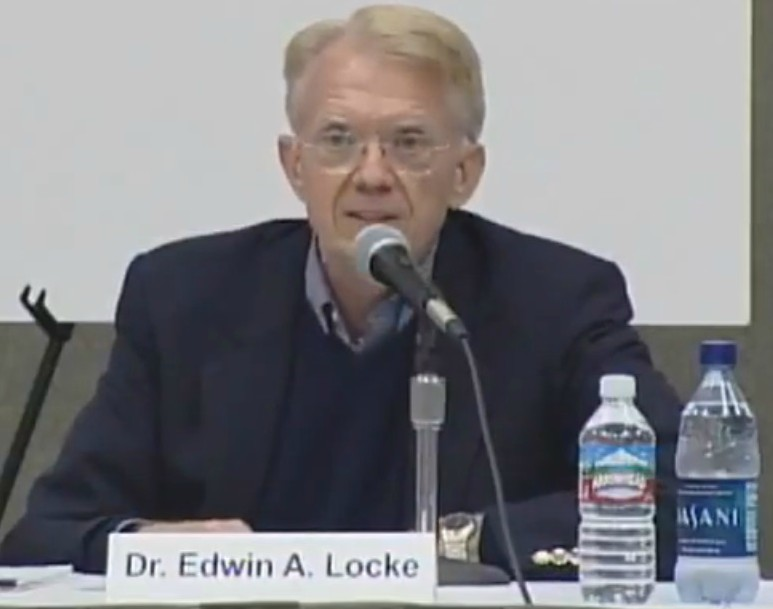
- Locke in 2006
- Born: Edwin A. Locke; May 15, 1938 (age 88)
- Education: Phillips Exeter Academy (HSDG); Harvard University (BA); Cornell University (MA, PhD)
- Known for: Goal-setting theory
- Awards: James McKeen Cattell Fellow Award
- Scientific career
- Fields: Industrial and organizational psychology Motivation; Leadership
- Workplaces: University of Maryland, College Park
- Website: edwinlocke.com

Edwin A. Locke (born May 15, 1938) is an American psychologist and a pioneer of goal-setting theory. He is a retired Dean's Professor of Motivation and Leadership at the Robert H. Smith School of Business at the University of Maryland, College Park, where he was also affiliated with the Department of Psychology. According to the Association for Psychological Science, "Locke is the most published organizational psychologist in the history of the field. His pioneering research has advanced and enriched our understanding of work motivation and job satisfaction. Goal-setting theory, developed based on decades of work with Gary Latham is arguably the most widely validated theory in industrial-organizational psychology." “His 1976 chapter on job satisfaction continues to be one of the most highly-cited pieces of work in the field."

Locke is a proponent of capitalism and, in agreement with the philosopher Ayn Rand, has argued that capitalism is both practical and moral, the only system capable of sustained wealth creation, and an expression of individual rights. He was personally acquainted with Rand.

Locke has also been a critic of the concept of emotional intelligence.

== Academia ==
Locke graduated high school from Phillips Exeter Academy in 1956. He obtained his bachelor's degree in Psychology from Harvard in 1960. Two years later, at Cornell, he earned his master's degree in Psychology, followed by his PhD in Industrial and Organizational Psychology in 1964. Locke's dissertation was on the relationship of intentions to motivation and affect. In 1964, he took a position as an associate researcher and later was a research scientist with the American Institutes for Research (AIR), where he remained affiliated through 1970.

In 1967, he accepted the position of assistant professor of Psychology at the University of Maryland. He became an associate professor of Business Administration at the University of Maryland in 1970, advanced to the rank of professor in 1972, served as Chair of the Management and Organization Faculty from 1984 to 1996, and was appointed Dean's Professor of Leadership and Motivation in 1998. Since his retirement in 2001, Locke has been Professor Emeritus at the University of Maryland.

== Theories ==
=== Goal Setting Theory ===
Goal-setting theory was foreshadowed by Locke in 1968 through the publication of his article “Toward a Theory of Task Motivation and Incentives”. The theory was developed through Locke’s laboratory experiments and the work of Gary Latham, who conducted experiments in organizational settings. The success of early experiments inspired additional studies by numerous other researchers. After several hundred studies had been conducted, Locke and Latham collaborated to develop a formal theory in their 1990 book A Theory of Goal Setting & Task Performance.

The book synthesizes core findings of research published to that point; identifies mediators of the effects of goals (such as attention, effort, and focus) and moderators—conditions required for goals to be effective—such as goal commitment, feedback on progress, expectancy and self-efficacy, and goal mechanisms; discusses goals and affect; and highlights practical applications. The appendices include theoretical extensions and guidelines for experimenters and managers.

Key findings of the theory include: (1) that setting specific (i.e., clear) goals leads to higher performance than setting nonspecific or vague goals, and (2) that goal difficulty is linearly and positively related to performance, such that more difficult goals lead to greater effort, focus, and persistence, resulting in higher performance. As noted above, moderators such as incentives, feedback, commitment, and the availability of resources are proposed to facilitate the influence of goals on performance. The model has generated a large body of empirical research, most of which has supported the theory’s predictions.

Goals are not limited to regulating performance outcomes. They may also be set for behaviors (e.g., improving customer interactions), for selling activities, or for learning and skill development.

In addition, “stretch goals”—goals that are extremely difficult or seemingly unattainable—may be useful provided that failure is not penalized and the emphasis is placed on improvement and learning. Penalizing failure to reach such goals may discourage effort and increase the likelihood of unethical behavior. Locke has emphasized that managers who use goal setting to motivate employees must establish and enforce clear ethical standards. To prevent cheating, especially when stretch goals are assigned, reliable measures of progress and goal attainment are essential.

=== Prime Mover Theory ===
Locke developed a model of successful business people. This model is based on observations of success, such as of Walt Disney, Sam Walton, and Mary Kay. In successful people, seven traits were observed at high levels:

1. Independent vision
2. An active mind
3. Competence and confidence
4. The drive to action
5. Egoistic passion
6. Love of ability in others
7. Virtue (integrity)

== Books ==
- Goal Setting: A Motivational Technique That Works (1984), co-authored with Dr. Gary Latham
- A Theory of Goal Setting and Task Performance (1990), co-authored with Gary Latham
- Study Methods and Study Motivation (1998)
- The Prime Movers: Traits of the Great Wealth Creators (2000)
- Postmodernism and Management: Pros, Cons and the Alternative (2003)
- Handbook of Principles of Organizational Behavior (2009)
- The Selfish Path to Romance: How to Love with Passion and Reason (2011), co-authored with Dr. Ellen Kenner
- New Developments in Goal Setting and Task Performance (2012), co-authored with Dr. Gary Latham
- The Illusion of Determinism: Why Free Will is Real and Causal (2017)

== Honors and awards ==
- Distinguished Scholar-Teacher from the University of Maryland (1983-1984)
- Outstanding Publication in Organizational Behavior Award, Academy of Management (1989, 2001)
- Distinguished Scientific Contribution Award, Society for Industrial and Organizational Psychology (1993)
- Career Achievement Award, Academy of Management, Human Resources Division (1996)
- Lifetime Achievement Award in Organizational Behavior, Academy of Management, Organizational Behavior Division (2005)
- James McKeen Cattell Fellow Award, Association for Psychological Science (2005–2006)
- Honored by the Federation of Associations in Behavioral & Brain Sciences (2010)
- Sage Scholarly Impact Award, for "The Case for Inductive Theory Building" (2012)

== Attainments ==
Locke is a fellow of the American Psychological Association (1972), the Association for Psychological Science, the Academy of Management (2006), International Association of Applied Psychology (2006), the Society for Industrial and Organizational Psychology, and the Society for Organizational Behavior.
