= Ayanna Kim Thomas =

Memory scientist

Ayanna Thomas

Academic background
- Education: Wesleyan University, University of Washington
- Thesis: Changing belief to memory : the role of sensory enhanced imagination and semantic activation in the creation and quality of false memories (2001)

Ayanna Kim Thomas is an American scientist, author, and cognitive researcher and the Dean of the Graduate School of Tufts School of Arts and Sciences. She also served as Dean Research for the School from 2021 to 2025. Her research focuses on the intersection of memory and aging, particularly as those fields relate to brain and cognitive science. She is a founding member of SPARK Society, editor-in-chief of the journal Memory & Cognition, and a fellow of the Psychonomic Society and the American Psychological Association Minority Fellowship Program.

== Early life ==
Thomas grew up in New York and attended Catholic school. She left Catholic school to attended Bronx High School of Science.

== Education and career ==
Thomas received her B.A. in African American studies and psychology from Wesleyan University in 1996 and matriculated to the University of Washington to earn her PhD in 2001. In 2004, she completed her post-doctoral work as a National Institute of Aging (NIA) Fellow at Washington University in St. Louis.

Thomas' journey to professorship began as a research scientist at Washington University. In 2004, she transitioned to assistant professor at Colby College in the Department of Psychology. In 2007, Thomas became an assistant professor at Tufts University. In 2019, she was promoted to professor at the Tufts University Department of Psychology, and named Editor-in-Chief of the journal Memory & Cognition, starting her term on January 1, 2020.

In 2021, Thomas was appointed as the Dean of Research for School of Arts and Sciences at Tufts University. In February 2025, she was appointed as the Dean of Graduate School of Arts and Sciences. Thomas is a founding member of the SPARK Society which is devoted to increasing representation in cognitive sciences for underrepresented minorities. Thomas has acquired fellow memberships with the Psychonomic Society and American Psychological Association Minority Fellowship Program.

In 2026, Thomas was announced as the president-elect of the Association for Psychological Science. Her term will commence June 1, 2026.

== Research ==
Thomas's research is in the field of psychology, memory and cognitive aging. Her approach to research is translational with the use of different methodological techniques. She is the principal investigator at the Cognitive Aging and Memory Lab at Tufts University.

Thomas was editor of the 2020 release of The Cambridge Handbook of Cognitive Aging: A Life Course Perspective. Her research has been covered by I Am a Scientist, National Public Radio, CBC News in Canada, and Popular Science.

== Selected publications ==
- Thomas, Ayanna K.; Loftus, Elizabeth F. (April 2002). "Creating bizarre false memories through imagination". Memory & Cognition. 30 (3): 423–431. doi:10.3758/BF03194942. PMID 12061762. S2CID 12243422.
- Thomas, Ayanna K.; Bulevich, John B.; Loftus, Elizabeth F. (June 1, 2003). "Exploring the role of repetition and sensory elaboration in the imagination inflation effect". Memory & Cognition. 31 (4): 630–640. doi:10.3758/BF03196103. ISSN 1532-5946. PMID 12872878. S2CID 18243239.
- Chan, Jason C.K.; Thomas, Ayanna K.; Bulevich, John B. (January 1, 2009). "Recalling a Witnessed Event Increases Eyewitness Suggestibility: The Reversed Testing Effect". Psychological Science. 20 (1): 66–73. doi:10.1111/j.1467-9280.2008.02245.x. ISSN 0956-7976. PMID 19037905. S2CID 4833910.
- Thomas, Ayanna K.; Millar, Peter R. (March 2012). "Reducing the framing effect in older and younger adults by encouraging analytic processing". The Journals of Gerontology. Series B, Psychological Sciences and Social Sciences. 67 (2): 139–149. doi:10.1093/geronb/gbr076. hdl:10.1093/geronb/gbr076. ISSN 1758-5368. PMID 21964668.
- Smith, Amy M.; Floerke, Victoria A.; Thomas, Ayanna K. (November 25, 2016). "Retrieval practice protects memory against acute stress". Science. 354 (6315): 1046–1048. Bibcode:2016Sci...354.1046S. doi:10.1126/science.aah5067. PMID 27885031. S2CID 20202825.

== Honors and awards ==
In 2018, Thomas received a Dalmas Taylor Award from the American Psychological Association. She received a mid-career award from the Psychonomic Society in 2021.
