= Center for Measuring University Performance =

Research center at the University of Massachusetts Amherst

The Center for Measuring University Performance is a research center at the University of Massachusetts Amherst. The Center is best known for an annual report it produces, The Top American Research Universities, that ranks American universities on nine different measures: Total Research, Federal Research, Endowment Assets, Annual Giving, National Academy Members, Faculty Awards, Doctorates Granted, Postdoctoral Appointees, and SAT/ACT range. The center also produces other scholarly works on ranking and education quality. The raw data used by the researchers at The Center is made available to the public on the web. This ranking's influence within the academic community has been described as being "commonly regarded to be one of three indicators that reflect an institution's rank as a Tier One institution", the other two being the classification of a university with "very high research activity" by the Carnegie Classification of Institutions of Higher Education and membership within the Association of American Universities.

Elizabeth Capaldi, former executive vice president and provost of Arizona State University, co-directed The Center for Measuring University Performance with John Lombardi, former president of the Louisiana State University system.
