= Goal ambiguity =

In business administration goal setting, goal ambiguity refers to the extent that organizational goals permit interpretative leeway.

Higher education in the United States has been criticized as suffering from goal ambiguity.
