= Temporal motivation theory =

Psychological theory of motivation

In psychology, temporal motivation theory (TMT) is an integrative motivational theory developed by Piers Steel and Cornelius J. König. The theory emphasizes time as a critical and motivational factor. The argument for a broad, integrative theory stems from the absence of a single theory that can address motivation in its entirety. Thus, it incorporates primary aspects of multiple major theories, including expectancy theory, hyperbolic discounting, need theory and cumulative prospect theory.

According to Schmidt, Dolis, and Tolli, Temporal Motivation Theory "may help further the understanding of the impact of time, and particularly deadlines, on dynamic attention allocation." The Temporal Motivation Theory formula can be applied to human behaviour, procrastination and to goal setting. According to Lord, Diefendorff, Schmidt, and Hall, the theory "models the motivating power of approaching deadlines, arguing that the perceived utility of a given activity increases exponentially as the deadline nears. These and similar ideas have been applied to the pervasive phenomenon of procrastination".

== Model ==
The theory states an individual's motivation for a task can be derived with the following formula (in its simplest form):

$$\mathrm{Motivation} = \frac{\mbox{Expectancy × Value}}{\mbox{1 + Impulsiveness × Delay}}$$

where $\text{Motivation}$, the desire for a particular outcome, $\text{Expectancy}$ or self-efficacy is the probability of success, $\text{Value}$ is the reward associated with the outcome, $\text{Impulsiveness}$ is the individual's sensitivity to delay and $\text{Delay}$ is the time to complete that task.

Since $\text{Expectancy}$ and $\text{Value}$ are in the numerator (Top of the Fraction) of the formula, any increase in those two values would result in an increase of motivation and vice versa; whereas $\text{Delay}$ and $\text{Impulsiveness}$ are in the denominator (Bottom of the Fraction) of the formula hence any increase in those two values would result in a decrease of motivation and vice versa.

== Example ==
To see how temporal motivation theory can be applied in an example, consider a student given one month to study for a final exam. The student is given two options—studying and socializing. The student enjoys socializing but needs to achieve a good grade. The reward of studying is not immediate thus at the beginning of the student's study period, the motivation to study is lower than the motivation to socialize. However, as the study period diminishes from several weeks to several days, the motivation to study will surpass the motivation to socialize.

== See also ==
- Motivation
- Goal setting
- Hyperbolic discounting
