= Suparna Rajaram =

Indian psychologist

- Born: Bellary, India
- Occupation: SUNY Distinguished Professor of Psychology

Academic background
- Education: Bangalore University, Purdue University, Rice University

Academic work
- Institutions: Stony Brook University

Suparna Rajaram, SUNY Distinguished Professor of Psychology at Stony Brook University, is an Indian-born cognitive psychologist and expert on memory and amnesia. Rajaram served as chair of the governing board of the Psychonomic Society (2008) and as president of the Association for Psychological Science (2017–2018). Along with Judith Kroll and Randi Martin, Rajaram co-founded the organization Women in Cognitive Science in 2001, with the aim of improving the visibility of contributions of women to cognitive science. In 2019, she was an inaugural recipient of Psychonomic Society's Clifford T. Morgan Distinguished Leadership Award for significant contributions and sustained leadership in the discipline of cognitive psychology. Rajaram is the 2025 recipient of the Provost's Outstanding Mentor Award at Stony Brook University.

Rajaram is a Fellow of the American Academy of Arts and Sciences, the Psychonomic Society, the American Association for the Advancement of Science, the American Psychological Association, the Eastern Psychological Association, and the Association for Psychological Science. She is also a member of the Society of Experimental Psychologists, a prestigious honor society dedicated to psychology. In 2022, Rajaram was named a Guggenheim Fellow.

== Biography ==
Suparna Rajaram was born in Bellary, India. She received a B.A. in psychology, Economics, and English Literature (1984) and a M.A. in psychology (1986) from Mt. Carmel College of Bangalore University. She moved to the United States to pursue a M.S. in Cognitive Psychology at Purdue University, and completed her degree in 1988 under the supervision of James H. Neely. Rajaram continued her education at Rice University, where she obtained her PhD in Cognitive Psychology in 1991 under the supervision of Henry L. Roediger, III. While at Rice, Rajaram collaborated with Roediger on research comparing assessments of implicit memory. From 1991 to 1993, Rajaram was a post-doctoral research fellow at Temple University School of Medicine, where she conducted research on amnesia with H. Branch Coslett.

Rajaram joined the Faculty of Psychology at Stony Brook University in 1993 and was promoted to full professor in 2003. She served as the associate dean for faculty affairs in the College of Arts and Sciences at Stony Brook University (2012–2015). Rajaram received a FIRST Award from the National Institutes of Mental Health (NIMH). In addition to NIMH, her research has been supported by the National Science Foundation, the Russell Sage Foundation, and Google. Rajaram served as associate editor of Psychological Science (2007–2008), Psychological Bulletin (2003–2005), and Memory & Cognition (1998–2001).

== Research ==
Rajaram's research program encompasses studies of human amnesia and intact memory to address the cognitive and neural bases of memory functions, such as the distinction between explicit memory and implicit memory. Her lab has examined differences in the effects of repeated testing and repeated studying on learning, and how repetition impacts learning of new information in amnesia. In one of her studies, her team examined how repetition of information confers advantages in knowing versus remembering information in individuals with amnesia. They found that repetition helped people with amnesia gain a sense of familiarity with material (i.e., knowing), whereas for individuals with normal memory, repetition enhanced both familiarity and recollection (i.e., knowing and remembering).

Rajaram has conducted numerous studies focusing on how social factors influence learning and memory. Her lab aims to understand the social transmission of memory in groups of people and in social networks, the emergence of collective memory, and how collaborative learning may help or hinder memory. Her research indicates that collaboration with peers often weakens the memory performance of individuals; at the same time getting help from one's peers may help to eliminate memory errors. Rajaram's 2014 paper on social transmission of memory, co-authored with H.Y. Choi, H.M. Blumen, and A.R. Congleton, was named "Best Paper of the Year" by European Society of Cognitive Psychology. This study examined a phenomenon known as collaborative inhibition, wherein individuals contribute less to recalling information when they are part of a group than when they are recalling information on their own. This study explored how changing the membership of groups influenced individual and collective memory. Rajaram and her colleagues have also studied how emotion enhances memory. They found that emotional memories are not immune to error, yet emotional memories are less likely to be distorted by social influences than nonemotional memories.

== Representative publications ==
- Rajaram, S. (1993). Remembering and knowing: Two means of access to the personal past. Memory & Cognition, 21 (1), 89–102.
- Rajaram, S. (1996). Perceptual effects on remembering: recollective processes in picture recognition memory. Journal of Experimental Psychology: Learning, Memory, and Cognition, 22 (2), 365–377.
- Rajaram, S. (1998). The effects of conceptual salience and perceptual distinctiveness on conscious recollection. Psychonomic Bulletin & Review, 5 (1), 71–78.
- Rajaram, S., & Geraci, L. (2000). Conceptual fluency selectively influences knowing. Journal of Experimental Psychology: Learning, Memory, and Cognition, 26 (4), 1070–1074.
- Rajaram, S., & Pereira-Pasarin, L. P. (2010). Collaborative memory: Cognitive research and theory. Perspectives on Psychological Science, 5 (6), 649–663.
- Rajaram, S., & Roediger, H. L. (1993). Direct comparison of four implicit memory tests. Journal of Experimental Psychology: Learning, Memory, and Cognition, 19 (4), 765–776.
