= Elizabeth D. Phillips =

University administrator (1945–2017)

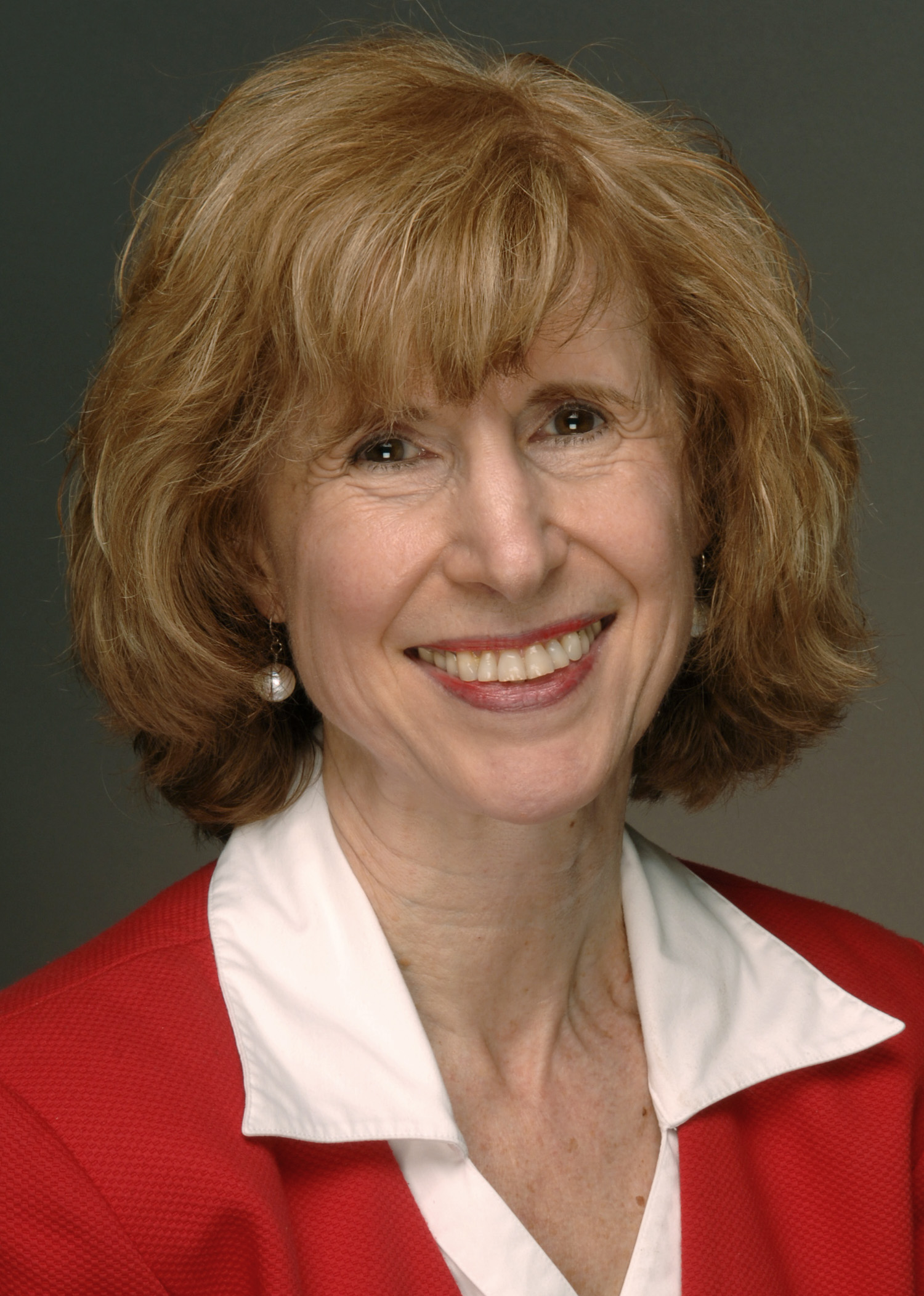
Phillips in 2006

Elizabeth D. "Betty" Phillips (née Capaldi; c. 1945 – September 23, 2017) was the Director of University of Florida Online. She resigned abruptly after serving only three months in that position, without explanation. She previously served as provost and executive vice president of Arizona State University (2006–2013) and provost of the University of Florida (1996–1999), among other administrative positions.

== Education ==
Phillips received her bachelor's degree from the University of Rochester in 1965 and her Ph.D. degree in experimental psychology from the University of Texas at Austin in 1969.

== Career ==
Phillips was a professor of psychology at Purdue University and served as head of Purdue's Department of Psychological Sciences and assistant dean of Purdue's Graduate School. At the University of Florida, Phillips served as provost and professor of psychology. She played a key role in improving sponsored research and technology transfer, and was instrumental in a new student advising system produced seven percent gain in the graduation rate.

Phillips served as provost and professor of psychology at the University at Buffalo, SUNY. As provost she stabilized the university's budget, which allowed increased faculty hiring and scholarship support that improved the quality and diversity of the student body. She oversaw a substantial increase in sponsored research at UB, and supported technology transfer and economic development for Buffalo. From December 2003 to July 2006, Phillips was the vice chancellor and chief of staff of The State University of New York, where her responsibilities included strategic planning, coordinating the activities of the vice chancellors to build quality across the SUNY system, and serving as the main liaison between system administration and the campuses.

Phillips served as the university provost and executive vice president at Arizona State University from 2006 to 2013. She was ASU's chief academic officer, overseeing 23 colleges. At ASU, Phillips led a university-wide effort to increase student retention. Under her direction, ASU instituted a new model for academic advising that transferred procedural functions such as course planning to an online tool. eAdvisor is based on the system that Capaldi developed during her brief, 3-month tenure at the University of Florida. Phillips also lead an ASU partnership with the Council for Aid to Education to conduct research on student learning in areas such as critical thinking and reasoning.

Phillips' research focused on learning and motivation with particular emphasis on the psychology of eating. She contributed over 65 chapters and articles to the scientific literature, co-authored three editions of an introductory psychology textbook, and edited two books on the psychology of eating.

Phillips co-directed The Center for Measuring University Performance with Dr. John Lombardi, president of the Louisiana State University system. The Center publishes analysis and publicly reported data that provide an alternative to traditional research university rankings.

== Service and awards ==
Phillips is past president of the Association for Psychological Science (2000–2001) and of the Midwestern Psychological Association (1991). She was elected to fellow status in the American Psychological Association, the American Psychological Society (now the Association for Psychological Science), and the American Association for the Advancement of Science. Her other honors and awards include election to the Friends of Students Hall of Fame at the University of Florida in 2000, and the Citizen of the Year award from the New York State Society of Professional Engineers in 2003.

== Death ==
Phillips died September 23, 2017, at her home after battling brain cancer for a year. She was 72.
