= I-Change Model =

In psychology, the I-change model or the integrated model, for explaining motivational and behavioral change, derives from the Attitude – Social Influence – Self-Efficacy Model, integrates ideas of Ajzen's Theory of Planned Behavior, Bandura's Social Cognitive Theory, Prochaska's Transtheoretical Model, the Health Belief Model, and Goal setting theories. Previous versions of this model (referred to as the Attitude, Social Norm, Self-Efficacy (ASE) model, derived from the Theory of Planned Behavior) have been used to explain a variety of types of health behavior.

== Phases of behavioral change ==
The I-Change Model is a phase model and assumes that at least three phases in the behavioral change process can be distinguished: 1. Awareness; 2. Motivation; 3. Action. For each phase particular determinants are more relevant.

=== Awareness ===
Awareness of a particular problem in a person is the result of accurate knowledge and risk perceptions of the person about his own behavior (not all persons are aware of the level of their own behavior, for instance, many persons overestimate the amount of their physical activity. Cues in their environment (e.g. a person with cancer) may also prompt a person to become more aware of a particular risk and the need to adopt a particular health behavior.

=== Motivation ===
Motivation to change a behavior depends on a person's attitude (the results of perceived advantages and disadvantages of the behavior), social influence beliefs (norms of others, behavior of others, and support of others) and self-efficacy expectations (the perceived ability to perform a particular health behavior). The ultimate result in level of motivation to adopt a health behavior can be measured by intentions, a concept derived from Fishbein & Ajzen's Theory of Reasoned Action or related concepts such as the stage of change concept of the Transtheoretical Model of Prochaska.

=== Action ===
Intentions do not necessarily lead to behavior. Factors determining action, besides a positive intention, are again self-efficacy, action planning and goal setting. With regard to action planning we distinguish preparation planning (planning actions required to change), initiation planning (planning the actions needed to perform the new behavior for the first time) and coping or maintenance planning (planning the actions to cope with barriers and relapse in order to maintain the realized changes). Additionally, the development of skills required for the new health behavior is needed as well.

== Predisposing factors ==
The I-Change Model assumes that these motivational processes are determined by various predisposing factors such as behavioral factors (e.g. life styles), psychological factors (e.g. personality), biological factors (e.g. gender, genetic predisposition), social and cultural factors (e.g. the price of cigarettes, policies), and information factors (the quality of messages, channels and sources used).

== See also ==
- Behavior change (public health)
- Behavioural change theories
- Goal setting
- Motivation
