= David A. Rosenbaum =

American psychologist (born 1952)

- Born: October 3, 1952 (age 74)
- Education: Swarthmore College (BA); Stanford University (PhD)
- Occupations: Psychologist, professor
- Spouse: Judith F. Kroll
- Scientific career
- Fields: Psychology

David A. Rosenbaum (born October 3, 1952) is an American psychologist whose research has focused on motor control and action planning. He is Distinguished Professor of Psychology at the University of California, Riverside, and Emeritus Distinguished Professor of Psychology at Pennsylvania State University.

== Education and career ==
Rosenbaum received a B.A. in psychology from Swarthmore College in 1973 and a Ph.D. in experimental psychology from Stanford University in 1977.

After receiving his doctorate, Rosenbaum worked at Bell Laboratories from 1977 to 1981. He was then a member of the faculty at Hampshire College from 1981 to 1987 and later at the University of Massachusetts Amherst before joining the faculty of Pennsylvania State University in 1994. In 2016, he joined the University of California, Riverside, where he serves as Distinguished Professor of Psychology.

From 2000 to 2005, Rosenbaum served as editor of Journal of Experimental Psychology: Human Perception and Performance.

== Research ==
Rosenbaum's research focuses on motor control and action planning, examining how people translate intentions into coordinated physical actions using behavioral experiments and computational models. His research also examines everyday action and social behavior, including cooperative behaviors such as holding doors for others.

His publications include studies of movement preparation, posture-based motion planning, grasp selection, and the planning of object manipulation. Rosenbaum and colleagues also introduced the term precrastination to describe the tendency to complete or begin tasks as soon as possible, even when doing so requires additional effort. He has also authored several books on theory of motor control and action, including Human Motor Control, It's a Jungle in There: How Competition and Cooperation in the Brain Shape the Mind, and Action, Mind, and Brain.

== Personal life ==
Rosenbaum is married to psychologist Judith F. Kroll.

== Honors and awards ==
Rosenbaum received a Guggenheim Fellowship in 2012.

He is a Fellow of the American Association for the Advancement of Science, the Association for Psychological Science, the American Psychological Association, and the Society of Experimental Psychologists.

== Selected works ==
=== Books ===
- Rosenbaum, D. A. (2010). Human Motor Control (2nd ed.). Academic Press.
- Rosenbaum, D. A. (2014). It's a Jungle in There: How Competition and Cooperation in the Brain Shape the Mind. Oxford University Press.
- Rosenbaum, D. A. (2022). Action, Mind, and Brain: An Introduction. MIT Press.

=== Selected articles ===
- Rosenbaum, D. A. (1983). "The movement precuing technique: Assumptions, applications, and extensions." Advances in Psychology 12: 231–274. doi:10.1016/S0166-4115(08)61994-9.
- Rosenbaum, D. A., Meulenbroek, R. J., Vaughan, J., & Jansen, C. (2001). "Posture-based motion planning: Applications to grasping." Psychological Review 108(4): 709–734. doi:10.1037/0033-295X.108.4.709.
- Rosenbaum, D. A. (2005). "The Cinderella of Psychology: The Neglect of Motor Control in the Science of Mental Life and Behavior." American Psychologist 60(4): 308–317. doi:10.1037/0003-066X.60.4.308.
- Santamaria, J. P., & Rosenbaum, D. A. (2011). "Etiquette and effort: Holding doors for others." Psychological Science 22(5): 584–588. doi:10.1177/0956797611406444.
- Rosenbaum, D. A., Fournier, L. R., Levy-Tzedek, S., McBride, D. M., Rosenthal, R., Sauerberger, K., VonderHaar, R. L., Wasserman, E. A., & Zentall, T. R. (2019). "Sooner rather than later: Precrastination rather than procrastination." Current Directions in Psychological Science 28(3): 229–233. doi:10.1177/0963721419833652.
