= SMART criteria =

Mnemonic, giving criteria to guide in the setting of objectives

Illustration of the meaning of the SMART acronym

SMART is a mnemonic acronym used to establish criteria for goals and objectives that are specific, measurable, assignable, realistic, and time-bound.

This framework is commonly applied in fields such as project management, employee performance management, and personal development. The term was first proposed by George T. Doran in the November 1981 issue of Management Review.

Since its inception, the SMART framework has evolved, leading to the emergence of different variations of the acronym. Commonly used versions incorporate alternative words, including attainable, relevant, and timely. Additionally, several authors have introduced supplementary letters to the acronym. For instance, some refer to SMARTS goals, which include the element of "self-defined", while others utilize SMARTER goals.

Proponents of SMART objectives argue that these criteria facilitate a clear framework for goal setting and evaluation, applicable across various contexts such as business (between employee and employer) and sports (between athlete and coach). This framework enables the individual setting the goal to have a precise understanding of the expected outcomes, while the evaluator has concrete criteria for assessment. The SMART acronym is linked to Peter Drucker's management by objectives (MBO) concept, illustrating its foundational role in strategic planning and performance management.

== History ==
In the November 1981 issue of the Management Review (AMA Forum), George T. Doran's paper titled "There's a S.M.A.R.T. way to write management's goals and objectives" introduces a framework for setting management objectives, emphasizing the importance of clear goals. The S.M.A.R.T. criteria he proposes are as follows:

- Specific: Targeting a particular area for improvement
- Measurable: Quantifying, or at least suggesting, an indicator of progress
- Assignable: Defining responsibility clearly
- Realistic: Outlining attainable results with available resources
- Time-related: Including a timeline for expected results

Doran clarifies that it's not always feasible to quantify objectives at all management levels, particularly for middle-management roles. He argues for the value in balancing quantifiable objectives with more abstract goals to formulate a comprehensive action plan. This emphasizes the integration of objectives with their execution plans as the foundation of effective management.

== Common usage ==
S.M.A.R.T. goals and objectives are key concepts in planning and project management. The acronym, while consistently used, applies differently to goals and objectives. Goals define the broad outcomes intended from a project or assignment, and objectives specify the actionable steps aimed at achieving these outcomes. There is acknowledgment of some variation in the application of the framework, reflecting a range of interpretations in practice.

Letter	Most common	Alternative
S	Specific	(Strategic and specific)
M	Measurable	
A	Achievable or attainable	Assignable (original definition), Agreed, action-oriented, ambitious, (agreed, attainable and achievable), aggressive
R	Relevant	Realistic, reasonable, (realistic and resourced), results-based
T	Time-bound	Time-based, time-oriented, time-limited, time/cost limited, timely, time-sensitive, timeframe

== Effectiveness ==
Research suggests that the effectiveness of the SMART goal-setting framework can vary depending on the context in which it is applied, indicating that its universal application might not always yield effective outcomes.

=== Career goals ===
A Michigan State University Extension study highlighted the effectiveness of the SMART goal-setting approach. It showed that individuals who wrote down their goals and outlined action steps had a 76% success rate in achieving them, especially when they shared weekly updates with a friend. This was compared to a 43% success rate for those who didn't document their goals, indicating an advantage to the structured approach of SMART goal-setting.

=== Physical activity ===
A review of literature indicates mixed effectiveness of the SMART acronym for increasing physical activity. Criticisms focus on its lack of scientific basis and empirical support, suggesting non-specific, open-ended goals might be more beneficial for some individuals. Research indicates that vague or challenging goals could be more effective than specific ones for increasing physical activity. Swann et al. highlight the original SMART framework's absence of theoretical or empirical foundation, contrasting with broader goal-setting research.

== Variations ==
The SMART framework has been expanded by some authors to include additional criteria, enhancing its versatility and application. Examples of these extensions are:

- SMARTER
  - Evaluated and reviewed
  - Evaluate consistently and recognize mastery
  - Exciting and Recorded
- SMARTIE
  - Equity and inclusion
- SMARTTA
  - Trackable and agreed
- SMARTA
  - agreed
- SMARRT
  - Realistic and relevance – 'Realistic' refers to something that can be done given the available resources. 'Relevance' ensures the goal is in line with the bigger picture and vision.
- I-SMART
  - A social goal or objective which demonstrates "Impact"

== Alternative acronyms ==
Other mnemonic acronyms (or contractions) also give criteria to guide in the setting of objectives.

- CLEAR: Collaborative; Limited; Emotional; Appreciable; Refinable
- CPQQRT: Context; Purpose; Quantity; Quality; Resources; Timing
- CSI-Approach: Challenging; Specific; Immediate; Approach Goals
- FAST: Frequently discussed; Ambitious; Specific; Transparent
- PURE: Positively stated; Understood; Relevant; Ethical
- REAP Resolve a Problem, Exploit an Opportunity, Align to a Strategic Objective, Produce a Business Benefit
- STD: Specific; Time-Bound; Difficult

== See also ==
- Management by objectives
- PDCA
- Performance indicator
- Strategic planning
