= Randi Martin =

Professor of Psychology at Rice University

Randi C. Martin
- Citizenship: United States
- Occupation: Professor of Psychology

Academic background
- Education: University of Oregon; Portland State University; Johns Hopkins University

Academic work
- Institutions: Rice University

Randi Martin is the Elma Schneider Professor of Psychology at Rice University and Director of the T. L. L. Temple Foundation Neuroplasticity Research Laboratory. With Suparna Rajaram and Judith Kroll, Martin co-founded Women in Cognitive Science in 2001, an organization supported in part through the National Science Foundation's ADVANCE Leadership program. She is a Fellow of the American Association for the Advancement of Science (AAAS) and the Society of Experimental Psychologists (SEP).

Martin is Senior Editor of the journal Cognition. Previously, she served on the Governing Board of the Academy of Aphasia and held leadership positions in the Psychonomic Society. In 1995 she was honored with the Claude Pepper Award from the National Institute on Deafness and Other Communication Disorders (NICHD) to study how language processing breaks down as a result of brain damage caused by stroke.

== Biography ==
Martin received a B.A. (1971) in General Social Science and Mathematics from University of Oregon. She completed a M.A. (1975) in Psychology at Portland State University and a M.S. in psychology (1977), under the supervision of James Paulson. She continued her education at Johns Hopkins University where she earned a PhD (1979) in Psychology and a post-doctoral fellowship. At Hopkins, Martin worked with Alfonso Caramazza on studies of categorization and short-term memory.

Since 1982, Martin has been a member of the faculty of Rice University.

== Research ==
Martin conducts research in the field of cognitive neuropsychology, with a specific focus on aphasia, psycholinguistics, and language processing in the brain. With funding from the NICHD, Martin and her colleagues have researched different types of short-term memory loss and its impact on word learning and sentence comprehension. Her research team uses neuroimaging (fMRI) to study language processing in individuals who have experienced brain damage or injury as well as in healthy individuals.

== Representation publications ==
- Martin, R. C. (1993). Short-term memory and sentence processing: Evidence from neuropsychology. Memory & Cognition, 21(2), 176–183.
- Martin, R. C. (2003). Language processing: functional organization and neuroanatomical basis. Annual Review of Psychology, 54(1), 55–89.
- Martin, R. C. (2005). Components of short-term memory and their relation to language processing: Evidence from neuropsychology and neuroimaging. Current Directions in Psychological Science, 14(4), 204–208.
- Martin, R. C., & He, T. (2004). Semantic short-term memory and its role in sentence processing: A replication. Brain and Language, 89(1), 76–82.
- Martin, R. C., Lesch, M. F., & Bartha, M. C. (1999). Independence of input and output phonology in word processing and short-term memory. Journal of Memory and Language, 41(1), 3-29.
- Martin, R. C., Shelton, J. R., & Yaffee, L. S. (1994). Language processing and working memory: Neuropsychological evidence for separate phonological and semantic capacities. Journal of Memory and Language, 33(1), 83–111.
