= Association for Psychological Science =

Academic research society

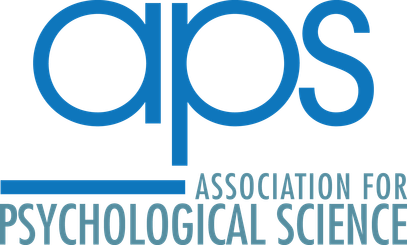
- Formation: August 12, 1988
- Headquarters: 1800 Massachusetts Ave. NW; Suite 402; Washington, D.C., United States
- Members: ~7,000 (As of June 2026)
- President: Pamela Davis-Kean
- Website: www.psychologicalscience.org

The Association for Psychological Science (APS), previously the American Psychological Society, is an international non-profit organization whose mission is to be the home of integrative and rigorous psychological science that connects people, methods, and careers for the public good across the world. APS publishes several journals, holds an annual meeting, disseminates psychological science research findings to the general public, and works with policymakers to strengthen support for scientific psychology.

== History ==
APS was founded in 1988 by a group of researchers and scientifically oriented practitioners who were interested in advancing scientific psychology and its representation at the national and international level. This group felt that the American Psychological Association (APA) was not adequately supporting scientific research because it focused on the practitioner/clinician side of psychology, and had effectively "become a guild". Tensions between the scientists and the practitioners escalated. The two groups had contrasting beliefs about such divisive issues as scientific versus human values, determinism versus Indeterminism, objectivism versus intuitionism, laboratory investigations versus field studies, nomothetic versus idiographic explanations, and elementism versus holism (Simonton, 2000).

The founding of the APS was only the most recent instance of long-standing intra-disciplinary tensions that have characterized the field since APA's inception in 1892. Organized psychology has always represented various constituencies, and beginning in the 1970s, there were several attempts to restructure the APA in an effort to mitigate internal tensions and satisfy the needs of a heterogeneous group. In 1987, the Assembly for Scientific and Applied Psychologists (ASAP) formed to support another reorganization effort, but ultimately this reorganization plan was rejected by the APA membership in early 1988. As a consequence, in August 1988, the ASAP became the APS.

APS surpassed 5,000 members in its first six months. As of June 2026, internationally, ~7,000 psychological scientists with specialties ranging from scientific research, applied science, and psychological education, are members of APS.

== Officials ==
As of 2026, the APS president is Pamela Davis-Kean. Ayanna Kim Thomas was announced as the president-elect, commencing June 1, 2026. APS officials have backgrounds in various fields of psychology, including cognitive science, developmental psychology, and social psychology. The organization's CEO is Robert E. Gropp.

=== Presidents ===
From 1988 to present:

- Charles Kiesler (–1988)
- Janet Spence (1988–1989)
- James L. McGaugh (1989–1991)
- Gordon Bower (1991–1993)
- Marilynn Brewer (1993–1995)
- Richard Thompson (1995–1996)
- Sandra Scarr (1996–1997)
- Kay Deaux (1997–1998)
- Elizabeth Loftus (1998–1999)
- Elizabeth D. Capaldi (1999–2000)
- Robert A. Bjork (2000–2001)
- John Darley (2001–2002)
- Susan T. Fiske (2002–2003)
- Henry L. Roediger, III (2003–2004)
- Robert W. Levenson (2004–2005)
- Michael S. Gazzaniga (2005–2006)
- Morton Ann Gernsbacher (2006–2007)
- John Cacioppo (2007–2008)
- Walter Mischel (2008–2009)
- Linda Bartoshuk (2009–2010)
- Mahzarin R. Banaji (2010–2011)
- Douglas L. Medin (2011–2012)
- Joseph E. Steinmetz (2012–2013)
- Elizabeth A. Phelps (2013–2014)
- Nancy Eisenberg (2014–2015)
- C. Randy Gallistel (2015–2016)
- Susan Goldin-Meadow (2016–2017)
- Suparna Rajaram (2017–2018)
- Barbara Tversky (2018–2019)
- Lisa Feldman Barrett (2019–2020)
- Shinobu Kitayama (2020–2021)
- Jennifer Eberhardt (2021–2022)
- Alison Gopnik (2022–2023)
- Wendy Wood (2023–2024)
- Randi C. Martin (2024–2025)
- Pamela Davis-Kean (2025–2026)

== Membership ==
The Association for Psychological Science (APS) as an international organization provides different membership categories to accommodate professionals and students within the field. APS members are psychological scientists and academics, clinicians, researchers, teachers, and administrators.

=== Categories ===
The membership categories are as follows:

- Member: Available to individuals with a PhD in psychology or a related discipline. Members receive access to APS journals, eligibility for awards and grants, and professional development resources.
- Associate member: Intended for professionals with a bachelor's degree or master's degree who are engaged in psychology or related fields. Associate members can access APS journals, networking opportunities, and online materials covering advancements in psychology.
- Student member: Open to undergraduate and graduate students studying psychology or related subjects. Student members have opportunities to present research, apply for grants and awards, receive career guidance, and participate in networking events.

=== Student caucus ===
Membership is also allowed in an affiliate form to undergraduate and graduate students pursuing a degree or its equivalent in psychology at an accredited degree-granting institution. The APS Student Caucus (APSSC) is a representative body of these student affiliates of the Association for Psychological Science. All graduate and undergraduate student affiliates of APS automatically become a member of the APSSC. Opportunities for involvement include serving as a Campus Representative, reviewing for research competitions, or publishing work in the "Student Notebook" and "Undergraduate Update" student publications.

The APSSC presents a wide array of programming for students and early-career professionals each year at the APS Annual Convention.

== Public outreach ==
APS publicizes psychology research in an effort to increase public understanding of psychological science. The APS website serves as a news portal for psychological science, distilling research results for a general audience, while maintaining a scientific approach to the field. In addition, the site houses the archive for the blogs We're Only Human and Full Frontal Psychology by science writer Wray Herbert. A version of his blogs appeared on The Huffington Post.

APS began a Wikipedia Initiative in February 2011, calling on APS members and their students to write, edit and update Wikipedia entries, with a focus on improving the scope and quality of the coverage of psychological science.

== Teaching initiatives ==
APS oversees several initiatives to facilitate the teaching of psychological science. The APS Fund for Teaching and Public Understanding of Psychological Science, established through the support of an endowment from the David & Carol Myers Foundation, supports activities that enhance education and communication in the scientific and academic sectors in psychology. APS co-sponsors an annual Teaching Institute in conjunction with the APS Annual Convention and sponsors and underwrites members' attendance at the National Institute on the Teaching of Psychology each year. APS also sponsored a Teaching Institute at the inaugural International Convention of Psychological Science (ICPS), held in Amsterdam in March 2015. High school teachers of psychology may receive a complimentary online subscription to Current Directions in Psychological Science, which includes articles particularly well suited to classroom use.

APS Classroom Use Policy: There is no reprint, copyright fee, or permission required for the use of any APS article for any teaching, classroom, or educational activity, provided that no resale occurs.

== Advocacy ==
APS was established in large part to provide a strong and separate voice for psychological science. From its founding, APS has advocated for funding for basic and applied behavioral research by educating federal science policymakers about the role of behavioral science in health, education, productivity and other areas of national concern. APS led the efforts to establish the following programs:

- A separate directorate for Social, Behavioral and Economic Sciences at the National Science Foundation. According to an issue of Science & Government Report, APS was in the "vanguard" of that effort.
- Grant programs for new behavioral science investigators at several National Institutes of Health (NIH) institutes. Known as B/START (Behavioral Science Track Awards for Rapid Transition), these programs provide early support for newly minted PhDs.
- National Institute of Mental Health Centers for Behavioral Science Research. These Centers helped to translate basic behavioral science findings into applications.
- The NIH Office of Behavioral and Social Sciences Research (OBSSR). APS supported the formation of OBSSR and APS worked with Congress to develop its mission.
- The establishment of the NIH Basic Behavioral and Social Science Opportunity Network (OppNet), funding $120 million in research through 2014.

APS also publishes the journal Psychological Science in the Public Interest which provides policy-makers and a non-psychology audience with a scientific perspective on issues of direct relevance to the general public.

== International integrative psychological science ==
APS is an international organization with members from more than 80 countries, with approximately 20 percent of the association's membership coming from outside North America. APS provides a home to psychological science's subdisciplines as well as research that crosses disciplinary and geographic boundaries.

Each year, the APS Annual Convention brings together psychological scientists and educators from around the globe for cross-cutting programs spanning the discipline. The Convention program is made up of invited talks, addresses, symposia, and special events, as well as submitted symposium and poster presentations.

In March 2015, the inaugural International Convention of Psychological Science (ICPS), organized under the auspices of APS, was held in Amsterdam, Netherlands. This first-of-its-kind event provided a forum for presentations on research and methodology across all of psychological science, neuroscience, genetics, sociology, anthropology, economics, linguistics, and related fields. In March 2017, the second ICPS was held in Vienna, Austria.

ICPS emerged from the Initiative for Integrative Psychological and Behavioral Science and is overseen by a steering committee of researchers. The initiative emphasizes the integration of research across multiple levels of analysis within psychology and related disciplines.

== Publications ==
- Psychological Science (1989–present)
- Current Directions in Psychological Science (1992–present)
- Psychological Science in the Public Interest (2000–present)
- Perspectives on Psychological Science (2006–present)
- Clinical Psychological Science (2013–present)
- Advances in Methods and Practices in Psychological Science (2018–present)
- The monthly Observer Magazine informs members on matters affecting research, academia, and applied disciplines of the field.

== Awards and honors ==
- William James Fellow Award: Honors APS members for their lifetime of significant intellectual contributions to the basic science of psychology. Recipients must be APS members recognized internationally for their outstanding contributions to scientific psychology.
- James McKeen Cattell Fellow Award: Recognizes APS members for a lifetime of outstanding contributions to applied psychological research. Recipients must be APS members whose research addresses a critical problem in society at large.
- Mentor Award: Recognizes those who have significantly fostered the careers of others, honoring APS members who masterfully help students and others find their own voice and discover their research and career goals.
- Janet Taylor Spence Award for Transformative Early Career Contributions: Recognizes transformative early career contributions to psychological science. Award recipients should reflect cutting edge ideas in psychological science.
- APS Fellows: Awarded to APS members who have made sustained outstanding contributions to the science of psychology in the areas of research, teaching, service, or application.
- APS Rising Star: early-career research award since 2009, which recognizes "researchers whose innovative work has already advanced the field and signals great potential for their continued contributions to psychological science".
- Psi Chi/APS Albert Bandura Graduate Research Award: By recognizing and awarding the most outstanding graduate, empirical research paper, the APS Albert Bandura Graduate Research Award promotes the first author's career in psychology by conferring official recognition in various forms from both Psi Chi and APS and a cash prize. This award honors Albert Bandura, a Distinguished Member of Psi Chi and a William James Fellow of APS, for significant lifetime contributions to psychology and for his exemplary and dedicated support and mentoring of students and their research throughout his long professional career.
- Scott Lilienfeld APS Travel Award, established in 2020 to fund travel and lodging for one or more graduate students attending the APS Annual Convention

== See also ==
- American Psychological Association
