= Motivation =

Inner state causing goal-directed behavior

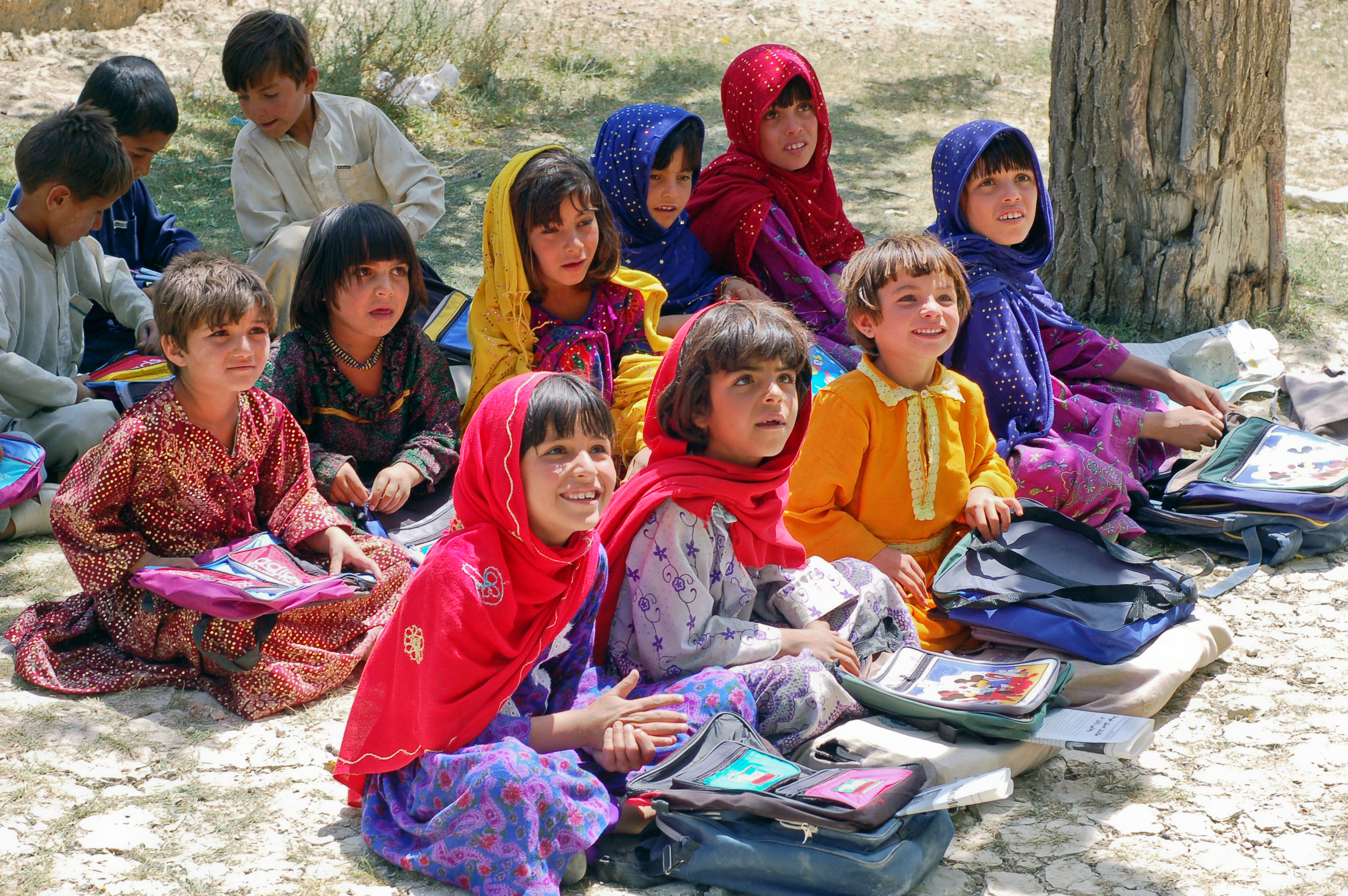
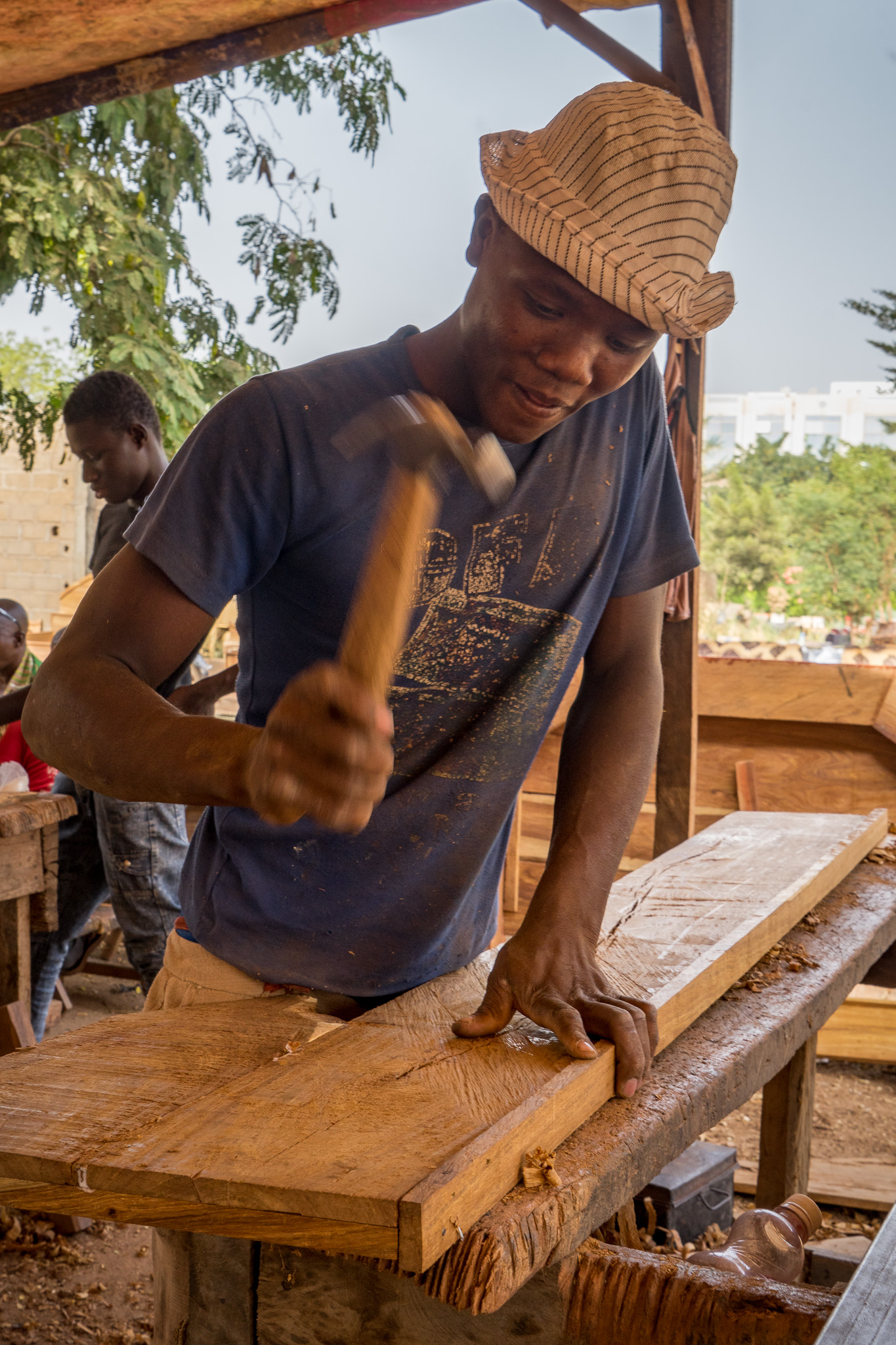
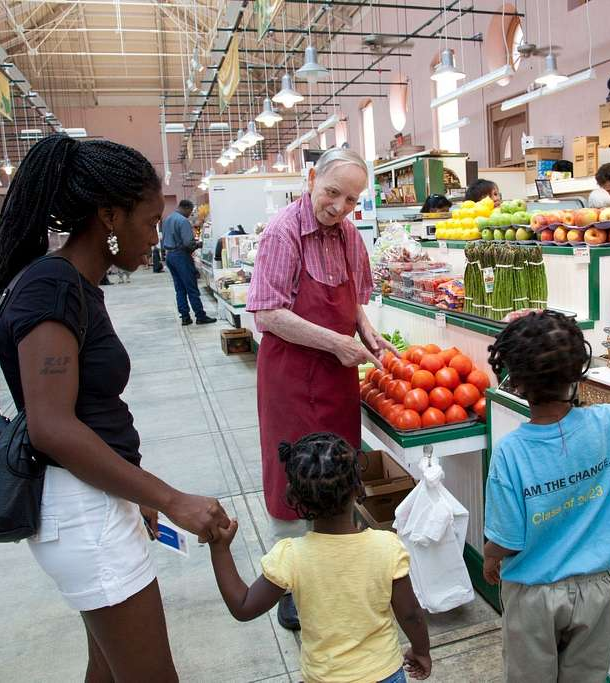
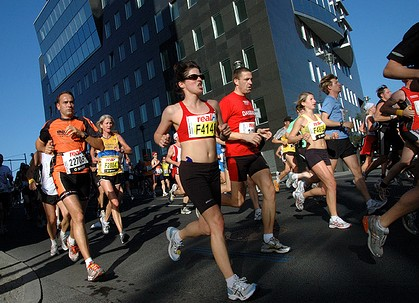
Motivation is relevant in many fields and affects educational success, work performance, consumer behavior, and athletic success.

Motivation is an internal state that propels individuals to engage in goal-directed behavior. It is often understood as a force that explains why people or other animals initiate, continue, or terminate a certain behavior at a particular time. It is a complex phenomenon and its precise definition is disputed. It contrasts with amotivation, which is a state of apathy or listlessness. Motivation is studied in fields such as psychology, motivation science, neuroscience, and philosophy.

Motivational states are characterized by their direction, intensity, and persistence. The direction of a motivational state is shaped by the goal it aims to achieve. Intensity is the strength of the state and affects whether the state is translated into action and how much effort is employed. Persistence refers to how long an individual is willing to engage in an activity. Motivation is often divided into two phases: in the first phase, the individual establishes a goal, while in the second phase, they attempt to reach this goal.

Many types of motivation are discussed in academic literature. Intrinsic motivation comes from internal factors such as enjoyment and curiosity; it contrasts with extrinsic motivation, which is driven by external factors such as obtaining rewards and avoiding punishment. For conscious motivation, the individual is aware of the motive driving the behavior, which is not the case for unconscious motivation. Other types include: rational and irrational motivation; biological and cognitive motivation; short-term and long-term motivation; and egoistic and altruistic motivation.

Theories of motivation are conceptual frameworks that seek to explain motivational phenomena. Content theories aim to describe which internal factors motivate people and which goals they commonly follow. Examples are the hierarchy of needs, the two-factor theory, and the learned needs theory. They contrast with process theories, which discuss the cognitive, emotional, and decision-making processes that underlie human motivation, like expectancy theory, equity theory, goal-setting theory, self-determination theory, and reinforcement theory.

Motivation is relevant to many fields. It affects educational success, work performance, athletic success, and economic behavior. It is further pertinent in the fields of personal development, health, and criminal law.

== Definition, measurement, and semantic field ==
Motivation is an internal state or force that propels individuals to engage and persist in goal-directed behavior. Motivational states explain why people or animals initiate, continue, or terminate a certain behavior at a particular time. Motivational states are characterized by the goal they aim for, as well as the intensity and duration of the effort devoted to the goal. Motivational states have different degrees of strength. If a state has a high degree then it is more likely to influence behavior than if it has a low degree. Motivation contrasts with amotivation, which is a lack of interest in a certain activity or a resistance to it. In a slightly different sense, the word "motivation" can also refer to the act of motivating someone and to a reason or goal for doing something. The term, motivation, comes from the Latin term movere (to move).

The traditional discipline studying motivation is psychology. It investigates how motivation arises, which factors influence it, and what effects it has. Motivation science is a more recent field of inquiry focused on an integrative approach that tries to link insights from different subdisciplines. Neuroscience is interested in the underlying neurological mechanisms, such as the involved brain areas and neurotransmitters. Philosophy aims to clarify the nature of motivation and understand its relation to other concepts.

Motivation is not directly observable but instead has to be inferred from other characteristics. There are different ways to do so and measure it. The most common approach is to rely on self-reports such as through questionnaires. This can include direct questions like "how motivated are you?" but may also inquire about additional factors such as goals, feelings, and effort invested in a particular activity. Another approach is based on external observation of the individual. This can involve studying behavioral changes but may also include additional methods like measuring brain activity and skin conductance.

=== Academic definitions ===
Many academic definitions of motivation have been proposed but there is little consensus on its precise characterization. This is partly because motivation is a complex phenomenon with many aspects and different definitions often focus on different aspects. Some definitions emphasize internal factors. This can involve psychological aspects in relation to desires and volitions or physiological aspects regarding physical needs. For example, John Dewey and Abraham Maslow use a psychological perspective to understand motivation as a form of desire while Jackson Beatty and Charles Ransom Gallistel see it as a physical process akin to hunger and thirst.

Some definitions stress the continuity between human and animal motivation, but others draw a clear distinction between the two. This is often emphasized by the idea that human agents act for reasons and are not mechanistically driven to follow their strongest impulse. A closely related disagreement concerns the role of awareness and rationality. Definitions emphasizing this aspect understand motivation as a mostly conscious process of rationally considering the most appropriate behavior. Another perspective emphasizes the multitude of unconscious and subconscious factors responsible.

Other definitions characterize motivation as a form of arousal that provides energy to direct and maintain behavior. For instance, Madsen saw motivation as "the 'driving force' behind behavior" while Vatenstein and Wong emphasize that motivation leads to goal-oriented behavior that is interested in consequences. The role of goals in motivation is sometimes paired with the claim that it leads to flexible behavior in contrast to blind reflexes or fixed stimulus-response patterns. This is based on the idea that individuals use means to bring about the goal and are flexible in regard to what means they employ. According to this view, the feeding behavior of rats is based on motivation since they can learn to traverse through complicated mazes to satisfy their hunger, which is not the case for the stimulus-bound feeding behavior of flies.

Some psychologists define motivation as a temporary and reversible process. For example, Hinde and Alcock saw it as a transitory state that affects responsiveness to stimuli. This approach makes it possible to contrast motivation with phenomena like learning which bring about permanent behavioral changes.

Another approach is to provide a very broad characterization to cover many different aspects of motivation. This often results in very long definitions by including many of the factors listed above. The multitude of definitions and the lack of consensus have prompted some theorists, like psychologists Bunnell and Dewsbury, to doubt that the concept of motivation is theoretically useful and to see it instead as a mere hypothetical construct.

=== Semantic field ===
The term "motivation" is closely related to the term "motive" and the two terms are often used as synonyms. However, some theorists distinguish their precise meanings as technical terms. For example, psychologist Andrea Fuchs understood motivation as the "sum of separate motives". According to psychologist Ruth Kanfer, motives are stable dispositional tendencies that contrast with the dynamic nature of motivation as a fluctuating internal state.

Motivation is closely related to ability, effort, and action. An ability is a power to perform an action, like the ability to walk or to write. Individuals can have abilities without exercising them. They are more likely to be motivated to do something if they have the ability to do it, but having an ability is not a requirement and it is possible to be motivated while lacking the corresponding ability. Effort is the physical and mental energy invested when exercising an ability. It depends on motivation and high motivation is associated with high effort. The quality of the resulting performance depends on the ability, effort, and motivation. Motivation to perform an action can be present even if the action is not executed. This is the case, for instance, if there is a stronger motivation to engage in a different action at the same time.

== Components and stages ==
Motivation is a complex phenomenon that is often analyzed in terms of different components and stages. Components are aspects that different motivational states have in common. Often-discussed components are direction, intensity, and persistence. Stages or phases are temporal parts of how motivation unfolds over time, like the initial goal-setting stage in contrast to the following goal-striving stage.

A closely related issue concerns the different types of mental phenomena that are responsible for motivation, like desires, beliefs, and rational deliberation. Some theorists hold that a desire to do something is an essential part of all motivational states. This view is based on the idea that the desire to do something justifies the effort to engage in this activity. However, this view is not generally accepted and it has been suggested that, at least in some cases, actions are motivated by other mental phenomena, like beliefs or rational deliberation. For example, a person may be motivated to undergo a painful root canal treatment because they conclude that it is a necessary thing to do even though they do not actively desire it.

=== Components ===
Motivation is sometimes discussed in terms of three main components: direction, intensity, and persistence. Direction refers to the goals people choose. It is the objective in which they decide to invest their energy. For example, if one roommate decides to go to the movies while the other visits a party, they both have motivation but their motivational states differ in regard to the direction they pursue. The pursued objective often forms part of a hierarchy of means-end relationships. This implies that several steps or lower-level goals may have to be fulfilled to reach a higher-level goal. For example, to achieve the higher-level goal of writing a complete article, one needs to realize different lower-level goals, like writing different sections of the article. Some goals are specific, like reducing one's weight by 3kg, while others are non-specific, like losing as much weight as possible. Specific goals often affect motivation and performance positively by making it easier to plan and track progress.

The goal belongs to the individual's motivational reason and explains why they favor an action and engage in it. Motivational reasons contrast with normative reasons, which are facts that determine what should be done or why a course of action is objectively good. Motivational reasons can be in tune with normative reasons but this is not always the case. For example, if a cake is poisoned then this is a normative reason for the host not to offer it to their guests. But if they are not aware of the poison then politeness may be their motivating reason to offer it.

The intensity of motivation corresponds to how much energy someone is willing to invest into a particular task. For instance, two athletes engaging in the same training drill have the same direction but differ concerning the motivational intensity if one gives their best while the other only puts in minimal effort. Some theorists use the term "effort" rather than "intensity" for this component.

The strength of a motivational state also affects whether it is translated into action. One theory states that different motivational states compete with each other and that only the behavior with the highest net force of motivation is put into action. However, it is controversial whether this is always true. For example, it has been suggested that in cases of rational deliberation, it may be possible to act against one's strongest motive. Another problem is that this view may lead to a form of determinism that denies the existence of free will.

Persistence is the long-term component of motivation and refers to how long an individual engages in an activity. A high level of motivational persistence manifests itself in a sustained dedication over time. The motivational persistence in relation to the chosen goal contrasts with flexibility on the level of the means: individuals may adjust their approach and try different strategies on the level of the means to reach a pursued end. This way, individuals can adapt to changes in the physical and social environment that affect the effectiveness of previously chosen means.

The components of motivation can be understood in analogy to the allocation of limited resources: direction, intensity, and persistence determine where to allocate energy, how much of it, and for how long. For effective action, it is usually relevant to have the right form of motivation on all three levels: to pursue an appropriate goal with the required intensity and persistence.

=== Stages ===
The process of motivation is commonly divided into two stages: goal-setting and goal-striving. Goal-setting is the phase in which the direction of motivation is determined. It involves considering the reasons for and against different courses of action and then committing oneself to a goal one aims to achieve. The goal-setting process by itself does not ensure that the plan is carried out. This happens in the goal-striving stage, in which the individual tries to implement the plan. It starts with the initiation of the action and includes putting in effort and trying different strategies to succeed. Various difficulties can arise in this phase. The individual has to muster the initiative to get started with the goal-directed behavior and stay committed even when faced with obstacles without giving in to distractions. They also need to ensure that the chosen means are effective and that they do not overexert themselves.

Goal-setting and goal-striving are usually understood as distinct stages but they can be intertwined in various ways. Depending on the performance during the striving phase, the individual may adjust their goal. For example, if the performance is worse than expected, they may lower their goals. This can go hand in hand with adjusting the effort invested in the activity. Emotional states affect how goals are set and which goals are prioritized. Positive emotions are associated with optimism about the value of a goal and create a tendency to seek positive outcomes. Negative emotions are associated with a more pessimistic outlook and tend to lead to the avoidance of bad outcomes.

Some theorists have suggested further phases. For example, psychologist Barry J. Zimmerman includes an additional self-reflection phase after the performance. A further approach is to distinguish two parts of the planning: the first part consists in choosing a goal while the second part is about planning how to realize this goal. Another outlook identifies the phases of goal setting, using feedback, managing multiple potentially conflicting goals, and leveraging social support.

== Types ==
Many different types of motivation are discussed in the academic literature. They differ from each other based on the underlying mechanisms responsible for their manifestation, what goals are pursued, what temporal horizon they encompass, and who is intended to benefit.

=== Intrinsic and extrinsic ===
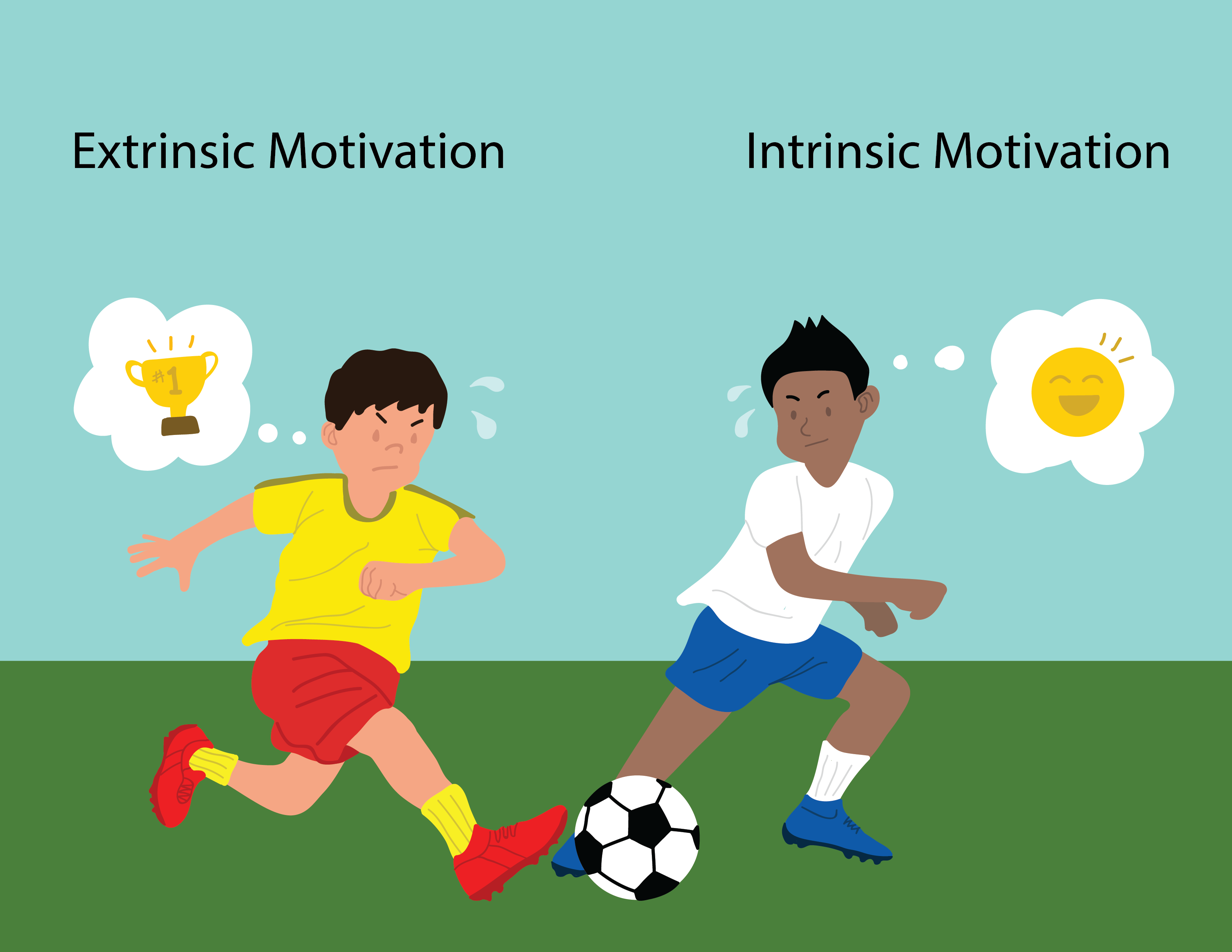
Intrinsic motivation arises from internal factors, like enjoying an activity. Extrinsic motivation is based on external factors, like rewards obtained by completing an activity.

The distinction between intrinsic and extrinsic motivation is based on the source or origin of the motivation. Intrinsic motivation comes from within the individual, who engages in an activity out of enjoyment, curiosity, or a sense of fulfillment. It occurs when people pursue an activity for its own sake. It can be due to affective factors, when the person engages in the behavior because it feels good, or cognitive factors, when they see it as something good or meaningful. An example of intrinsic motivation is a person who plays basketball during lunch break only because they enjoy it.

Extrinsic motivation arises from external factors, such as rewards, punishments, or recognition from others. This occurs when people engage in an activity because they are interested in the effects or the outcome of the activity rather than in the activity itself. For instance, if a student does their homework because they are afraid of being punished by their parents then extrinsic motivation is responsible.

Intrinsic motivation is often more highly regarded than extrinsic motivation. It is associated with genuine passion, creativity, a sense of purpose, and personal autonomy. It also tends to come with stronger commitment and persistence. Intrinsic motivation is a key factor in cognitive, social, and physical development. The degree of intrinsic motivation is affected by various conditions, including a sense of autonomy and positive feedback from others. In the field of education, intrinsic motivation tends to result in high-quality learning. However, there are also certain advantages to extrinsic motivation: it can provide people with motivation to engage in useful or necessary tasks which they do not naturally find interesting or enjoyable. Some theorists understand the difference between intrinsic and extrinsic motivation as a spectrum rather than a clear dichotomy. This is linked to the idea that the more autonomous an activity is, the more it is associated with intrinsic motivation.

A behavior can be motivated only by intrinsic motives, only by extrinsic motives, or by a combination of both. In the latter case, there are both internal and external reasons why the person engages in the behavior. If both are present, they may work against each other. For example, the presence of a strong extrinsic motivation, like a high monetary reward, can decrease intrinsic motivation. Because of this, the individual may be less likely to further engage in the activity if it does not result in an external reward anymore. However, this is not always the case and under the right circumstances, the combined effects of intrinsic and extrinsic motivation leads to higher performance.

=== Conscious and unconscious ===
Conscious motivation involves motives of which the person is aware. It includes the explicit recognition of goals and underlying values. Conscious motivation is associated with the formulation of a goal and a plan to realize it as well as its controlled step-by-step execution. Some theorists emphasize the role of the self in this process as the entity that plans, initiates, regulates, and evaluates behavior. An example of conscious motivation is a person in a clothing store who states that they want to buy a shirt and then goes on to buy one.

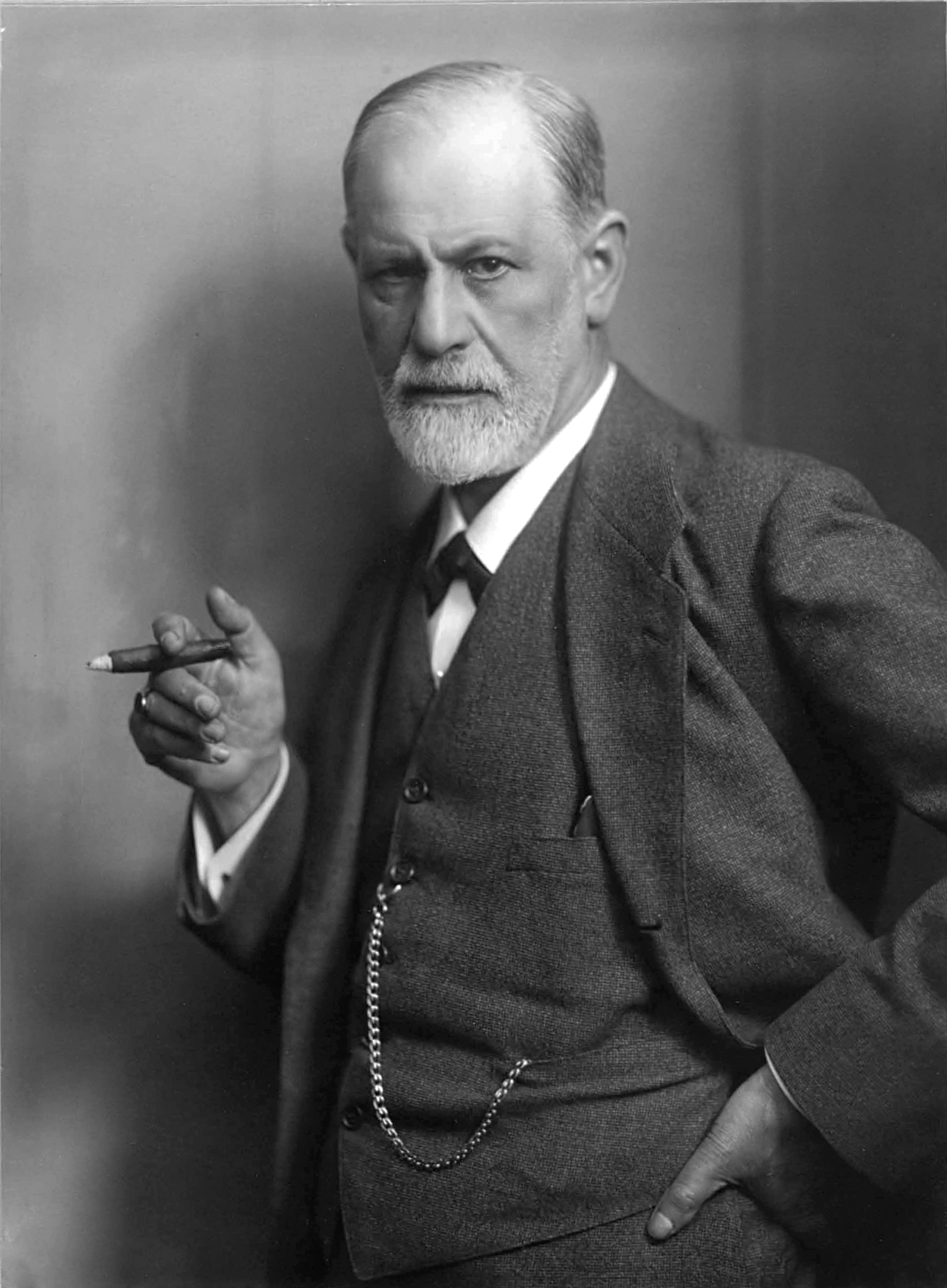
Unconscious motivation plays a central role in Sigmund Freud's psychoanalysis.

Unconscious motivation involves motives of which the person is not aware. It can be guided by deep-rooted beliefs, desires, and feelings operating beneath the level of consciousness. Examples include the unacknowledged influences of past experiences, unresolved conflicts, hidden fears, and defense mechanisms. These influences can affect decisions, impact behavior, and shape habits. An example of unconscious motivation is a scientist who believes that their research effort is a pure expression of their altruistic desire to benefit science while their true motive is an unacknowledged need for fame. External circumstances can also impact the motivation underlying unconscious behavior. An example is the effect of priming, in which an earlier stimulus influences the response to a later stimulus without the person's awareness of this influence. Unconscious motivation is a central topic in Sigmund Freud's psychoanalysis.

Early theories of motivation often assumed that conscious motivation is the primary form of motivation. However, this view has been challenged in the subsequent literature and there is no academic consensus on the relative extent of their influence.

=== Rational and irrational ===
Closely related to the contrast between conscious and unconscious motivation is the distinction between rational and irrational motivation. A motivational state is rational if it is based on a good reason. This implies that the motive of the behavior explains why the person should engage in the behavior. In this case, the person has an insight into why the behavior is considered valuable. For example, if a person saves a drowning child because they value the child's life, then their motivation is rational.

Rational motivation contrasts with irrational motivation, in which the person has no good reason that explains the behavior. In this case, the person lacks a clear understanding of the deeper source of motivation and in what sense the behavior is in tune with their values. This can be the case for impulsive behavior, for example, when a person spontaneously acts out of anger without reflecting on the consequences of their actions.

Rational and irrational motivation play a key role in the field of economics. In order to predict the behavior of economic actors, it is often assumed that they act rationally. In this field, rational behavior is understood as behavior that is in tune with self-interest while irrational behavior goes against self-interest. For example, based on the assumption that it is in the self-interest of firms to maximize profit, actions that lead to that outcome are considered rational while actions that impede profit maximization are considered irrational. However, when understood in a wider sense, rational motivation is a broader term that also includes behavior motivated by a desire to benefit others as a form of rational altruism.

=== Biological and cognitive ===
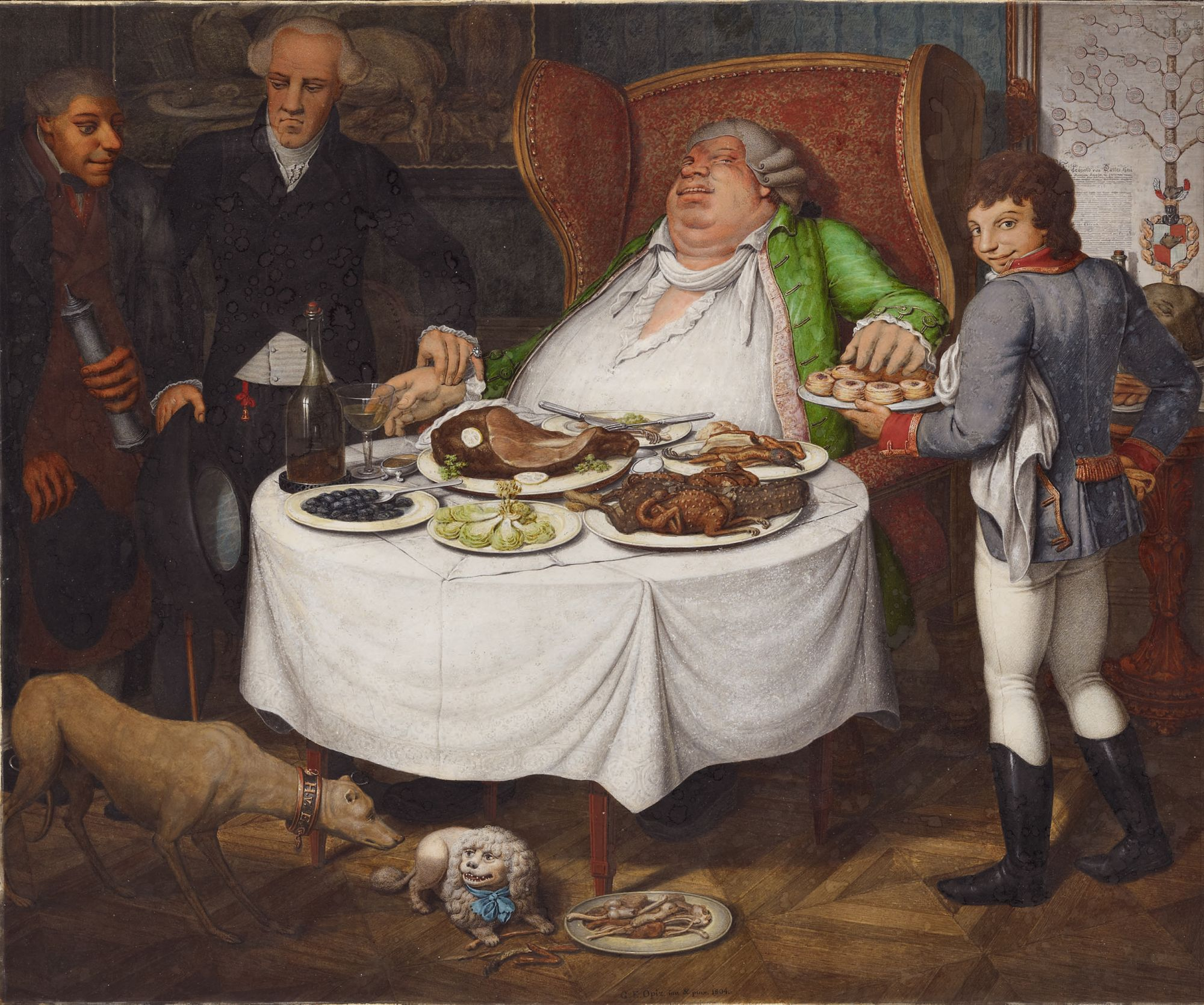
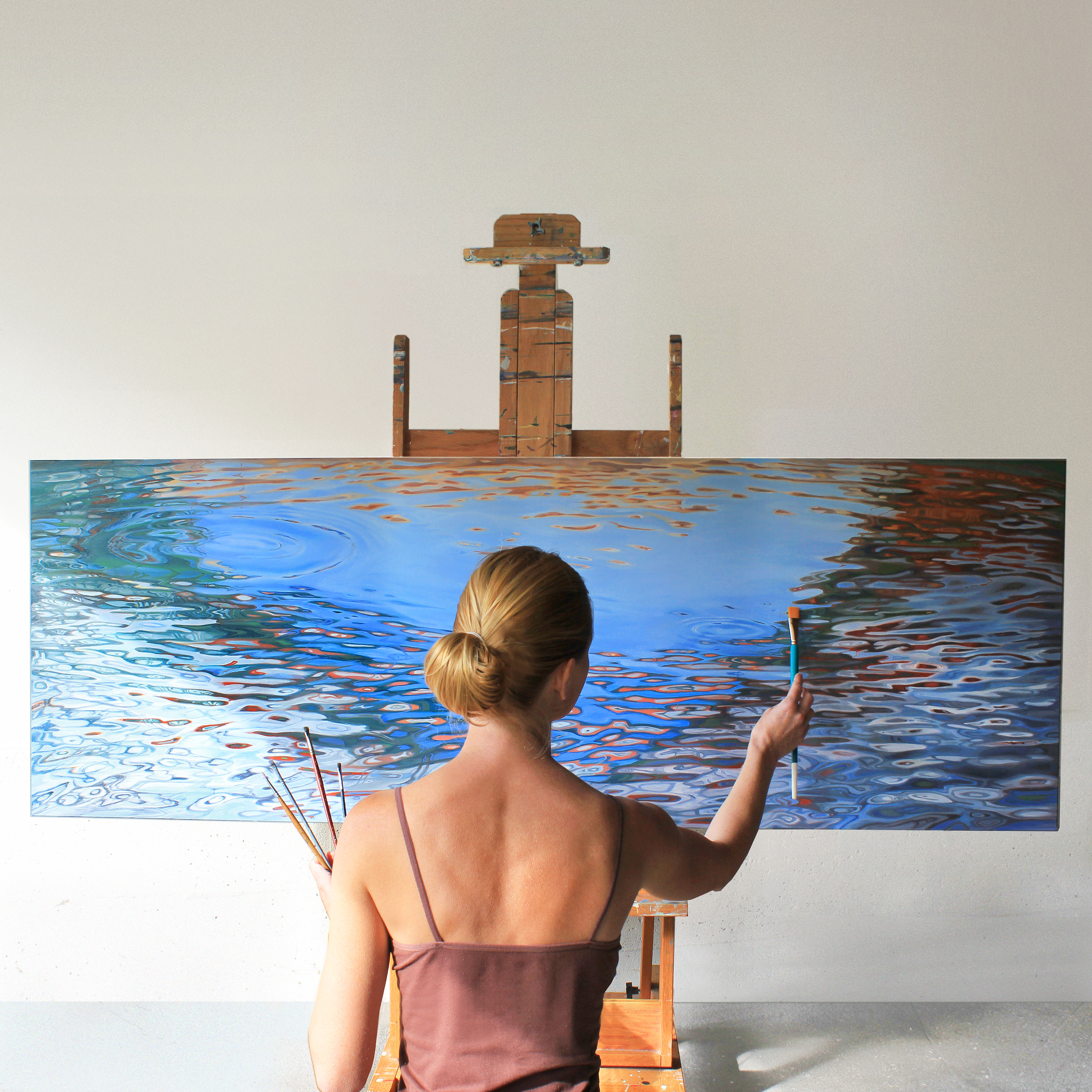
Hunger and thirst are physiological needs associated with biological motivation while the artistic pursuit of beauty belongs to cognitive motivation.

Biological motivation concerns motives that arise due to physiological needs. Examples are hunger, thirst, sex, and the need for sleep. They are also referred to as primary, physiological, or organic motives. Biological motivation is associated with states of arousal and emotional changes. Its source lies in innate mechanisms that govern stimulus-response patterns.

Cognitive motivation concerns motives that arise from the psychological level. They include affiliation, competition, personal interests, and self-actualization as well as desires for perfection, justice, beauty, and truth. They are also called secondary, psychological, social, or personal motives. They are often seen as a higher or more refined form of motivation. The processing and interpretation of information play a key role in cognitive motivation. Cognitively motivated behavior is not an innate reflex but a flexible response to the available information that is based on past experiences and expected outcomes. It is associated with the explicit formulation of desired outcomes and engagement in goal-directed behavior to realize these outcomes.

Some theories of human motivation see biological causes as the source of all motivation. They tend to conceptualize human behavior in analogy to animal behavior. Other theories allow for both biological and cognitive motivation and some put their main emphasis on cognitive motivation.

=== Short-term and long-term ===
Short-term and long-term motivation differ in regard to the temporal horizon and the duration of the underlying motivational mechanism. Short-term motivation is focused on achieving rewards immediately or in the near future. It is associated with impulsive behavior. It is a transient and fluctuating phenomenon that may arise and subside spontaneously.

Long-term motivation involves a sustained commitment to goals in a more distant future. It encompasses a willingness to invest time and effort over an extended period before the intended goal is reached. It is often a more deliberative process that requires goal-setting and planning.

Both short-term and long-term motivation are relevant to achieving one's goals. For example, short-term motivation is central when responding to urgent problems while long-term motivation is a key factor in pursuing far-reaching objectives. However, they sometimes conflict with each other by supporting opposing courses of action. An example is a married person who is tempted to have a one-night stand. In this case, there may be a clash between the short-term motivation to seek immediate physical gratification and the long-term motivation to preserve and nurture a successful marriage built on trust and commitment. Another example is the long-term motivation to stay healthy in contrast to the short-term motivation to smoke a cigarette.

=== Egoistic and altruistic ===
The difference between egoistic and altruistic motivation concerns who is intended to benefit from the anticipated course of action. Egoistic motivation is driven by self-interest: the person is acting for their own benefit or to fulfill their own needs and desires. This self-interest can take various forms, including immediate pleasure, career advancement, financial rewards, and gaining respect from others.

Altruistic motivation is marked by selfless intentions and involves a genuine concern for the well-being of others. It is associated with the desire to assist and help others in a non-transactional manner without the goal of obtaining personal gain or rewards in return.

According to the controversial thesis of psychological egoism, there is no altruistic motivation: all motivation is egoistic. Proponents of this view hold that even apparently altruistic behavior is caused by egoistic motives. For example, they may claim that people feel good about helping other people and that their egoistic desire to feel good is the true internal motivation behind the externally altruistic behavior.

Many religions emphasize the importance of altruistic motivation as a component of religious practice. For example, Christianity sees selfless love and compassion as a way of realizing God's will and bringing about a better world. Buddhists emphasize the practice of loving-kindness toward all sentient beings as a means to eliminate suffering.

=== Others ===
Many other types of motivation are discussed in the academic literature. Moral motivation is closely related to altruistic motivation. Its motive is to act in tune with moral judgments and it can be characterized as the willingness to "do the right thing". The desire to visit a sick friend to keep a promise is an example of moral motivation. It can conflict with other forms of motivation, like the desire to go to the movies instead. An influential debate in moral philosophy centers around the question of whether moral judgments can directly provide moral motivation, as internalists claim. Externalists provide an alternative explanation by holding that additional mental states, like desires or emotions, are needed. Externalists hold that these additional states do not always accompany moral judgments, meaning that it would be possible to have moral judgments without a moral motivation to follow them. Certain forms of psychopathy and brain damage can inhibit moral motivation.

Self-determination theorists, such as Edward Deci and Richard Ryan, distinguish between autonomous and controlled motivation. Autonomous motivation is associated with acting according to one's free will or doing something because one wants to do it. In the case of controlled motivation, the person feels pressured into doing something by external forces.

A related contrast is between push and pull motivation. Push motivation arises from unfulfilled internal needs and aims at satisfying them. For example, hunger may push an individual to find something to eat. Pull motivation arises from an external goal and aims at achieving this goal, like the motivation to get a university degree.

Achievement motivation is the desire to overcome obstacles and strive for excellence. Its goal is to do things well and become better even in the absence of tangible external rewards. It is closely related to the fear of failure. An example of achievement motivation in sports is a person who challenges stronger opponents in an attempt to get better.

Human motivation is sometimes contrasted with animal motivation. The field of animal motivation examines the reasons and mechanisms underlying animal behavior. It belongs to psychology and zoology. It gives specific emphasis to the interplay of external stimulation and internal states. It further considers how an animal benefits from a certain behavior as an individual and in terms of evolution. There are important overlaps between the fields of animal and human motivation. Studies on animal motivation tend to focus more on the role of external stimuli and instinctive responses while the role of free decisions and delayed gratification has a more prominent place when discussing human motivation.

== Amotivation and akrasia ==
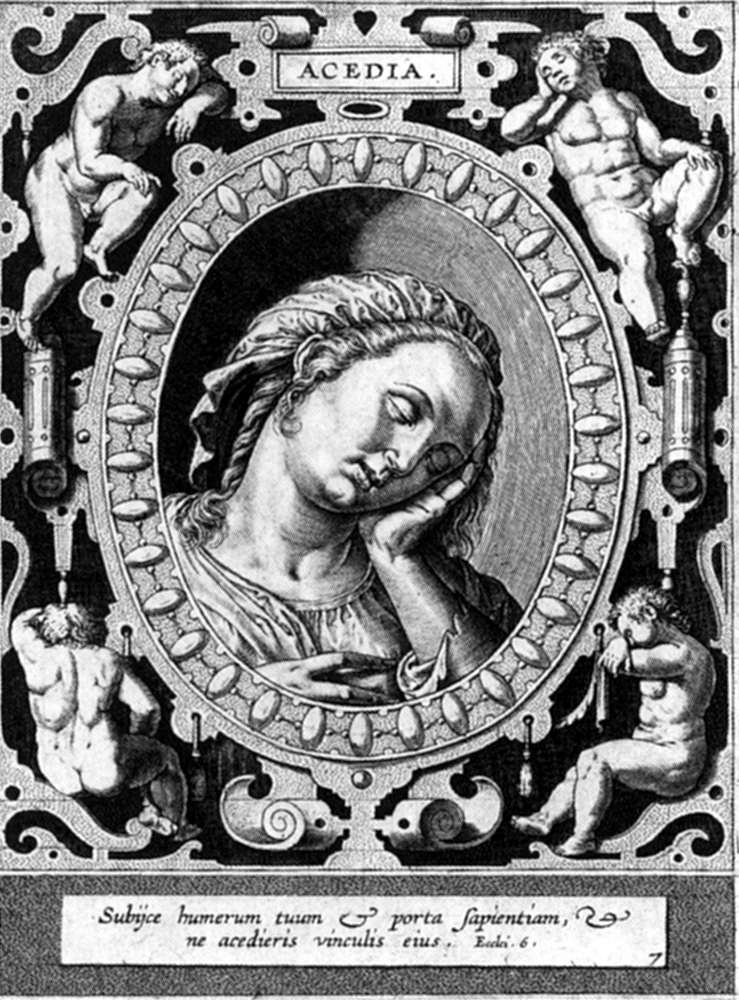
Amotivation is an absence of interest and is sometimes described as acedia when it manifests in relation to spiritual practices.

Motivation contrasts with amotivation (also known as avolition) which is an absence of interest. Individuals in the state of amotivation feel apathy or lack the willingness to engage in a particular behavior. For instance, amotivated children at school remain passive in class, do not engage in classroom activities, and fail to follow teacher instructions. Amotivation can be a significant barrier to productivity, goal attainment, and overall well-being. It can be caused by factors like unrealistic expectations, helplessness, feelings of incompetence, and the inability to see how one's actions affect outcomes. In the field of Christian spirituality, the terms acedia and accidie are often used to describe a form of amotivation or listlessness associated with a failure to engage in spiritual practices. Amotivation is usually a temporary state. The term amotivational syndrome refers to a more permanent and wide-reaching condition. It involves apathy and lack of activity in relation to a broad range of activities and is associated with incoherence, inability to concentrate, and memory disturbance. The term disorders of diminished motivation covers a wide range of related phenomena, including abulia, akinetic mutism, and other motivation-related neurological disorders.

Amotivation is closely related to akrasia. A person in the state of akrasia believes that they should perform a certain action but cannot motivate themselves to do it. This means that there is an internal conflict between what a person believes they should do and what they actually do. The cause of akrasia is sometimes that a person gives in to temptations and is not able to resist them. For this reason, akrasia is also referred to as weakness of the will. An addict who compulsively consumes drugs even though they know that it is not in their best self-interest is an example of akrasia. Akrasia contrasts with enkrasia, which is a state where a person's motivation aligns with their beliefs.

== Theories ==
Theories of motivation are frameworks or sets of principles that aim to explain motivational phenomena. They seek to understand how motivation arises and what causes and effects it has as well as the goals that commonly motivate people. This way, they provide explanations of why an individual engages in one behavior rather than another, how much effort they invest, and how long they continue to strive toward a given goal.

Major debates in the academic literature concern to what extent motivation is innate or based on genetically determined instincts rather than learned through previous experience. A closely related issue is whether motivational processes are mechanistic and run automatically or have a more complex nature involving cognitive processes and active decision-making. Another discussion revolves around the topic of whether the primary sources of motivation are internal needs rather than external goals.

A common distinction among theories of motivation is between content theories and process theories. Content theories attempt to identify and describe the internal factors that motivate people, such as different types of needs, drives, and desires. They examine which goals motivate people. Influential content theories are Maslow's hierarchy of needs, Frederick Herzberg's two-factor theory, and David McClelland's learned needs theory. Process theories discuss the cognitive, emotional, and decision-making processes that underlie human motivation. They examine how people select goals and the means to achieve them. Major process theories are expectancy theory, equity theory, goal-setting theory, self-determination theory, and reinforcement theory. Another way to classify theories of motivation focuses on the role of inborn physiological processes in contrast to cognitive processes and distinguishes between biological, psychological, and biopsychosocial theories.

=== Major content theories ===
Maslow's hierarchy of needs is often visualized as a pyramid in which the more basic needs at the bottom form the foundation for higher needs.

Maslow theorised that humans have different kinds of needs and that those needs are responsible for motivation. According to him, they form a hierarchy of needs that is composed of lower and higher needs. Lower needs belong to the physiological level and are characterized as deficiency needs since they indicate some form of lack. Examples are the desire for food, water, and shelter. Higher needs belong to the psychological level and are associated with the potential to grow as a person. Examples are self-esteem in the form of a positive self-image and personal development by actualizing one's unique talents and abilities. Two key principles of Maslow's theory are the progression principle and the deficit principle. They state that lower needs have to be fulfilled before higher needs become activated. This means that higher needs, like esteem and self-actualization, are unable to provide full motivation while lower needs, like food and shelter, remain unfulfilled. (Note: A person's stage of life can also affect which needs provide motivation. Young children may not be concerned with certain needs associated with higher levels, for example, by prioritizing friendship over respect and public opinion.) An influential extension of Maslow's hierarchy of needs was proposed by Clayton Alderfer in the form of his ERG theory.

Herzberg's Two-Factor Theory also analyzes motivation in terms of lower and higher needs. Herzberg applies it specifically to the workplace and distinguishes between lower-lever hygiene factors and higher-level motivators. Hygiene factors are associated with the work environment and conditions. Examples include company policies, supervision, salary, and job security. They are essential to prevent job dissatisfaction and associated negative behavior, such as frequent absence or decreased effort. Motivators are more directly related to work itself. They include the nature of the work and the associated responsibility as well as recognition and personal and professional growth opportunities. They are responsible for job satisfaction as well as increased commitment and creativity. This theory implies, for example, that increasing salary and job security may not be sufficient to fully motivate workers if their higher needs are not met.

McClelland's learned needs theory states that individuals have three primary needs: affiliation, power, and achievement. The need for affiliation is a desire to form social connections with others. The need for power is a longing to exert control over one's surroundings and wield influence over others. The need for achievement relates to a yearning to establish ambitious objectives and to receive positive feedback on one's performance. McClelland holds that these needs are present in everyone but that their exact form, strength, and expression is shaped by cultural influences and the individual's experiences. For example, affiliation-oriented individuals are primarily motivated by establishing and maintaining social relations while achievement-oriented individuals are inclined to set challenging goals and strive for personal excellence. More emphasis on the need of affiliation tends to be given in collectivist cultures in contrast to a focus on the need of achievement in individualist cultures.

=== Major process theories ===
Expectancy theory states that whether a person is motivated to perform a certain behavior depends on the expected results of this behavior: the more positive the expected results are, the higher the motivation to engage in that behavior. Expectancy theorists understand the expected results in terms of three factors: expectancy, instrumentality, and valence. Expectancy concerns the relation between effort and performance. If the expectancy of a behavior is high then the person believes that their efforts will likely result in successful performance. Instrumentality concerns the relation between performance and outcomes. If the instrumentality of a performance is high then the person believes that it will likely result in the intended outcomes. Valence is the degree to which the outcomes are attractive to the person. These three components affect each other in a multiplicative way, meaning that high motivation is only present if all of them are high. In this case, the person believes it likely that they perform well, that the performance leads to the expected result, and that the result as a high value.

Equity theory sees fairness as a key aspect of motivation. According to it, people are interested in the proportion between effort and reward: they judge how much energy one has to invest and how good the outcome is. Equity theory states that individuals assess fairness by comparing their own ratio of effort and reward to the ratio of others. A key idea of equity theory is that people are motivated to reduce perceived inequity. This is especially the case if they feel that they receive fewer rewards than others. For example, if an employee has the impression that they work longer than their co-workers while receiving the same salary, this may motivate them to ask for a raise.

Goal-setting theory holds that having clearly defined goals is one of the key factors of motivation. It states that effective goals are specific and challenging. A goal is specific if it involves a clear objective, such as a quantifiable target one intends to reach rather than just trying to do one's best. A goal is challenging if it is achievable but hard to reach. Two additional factors identified by goal-setting theorists are goal commitment and self-efficacy. Commitment is a person's dedication to achieving a goal and includes an unwillingness to abandon or change the goal when meeting resistance. To have self-efficacy means to believe in oneself and in one's ability to succeed. This belief can help people persevere through obstacles and remain motivated to reach challenging goals.

According to self-determination theory, the main factors influencing motivation are autonomy, competence, and connection. People act autonomously if they decide themselves what to do rather than following orders. This tends to increase motivation since humans usually prefer to act in accordance with their wishes, values, and goals without being coerced by external forces. If a person is competent at a certain task then they tend to feel good about the work itself and its results. Lack of competence can decrease motivation by leading to frustration if one's efforts fail to succeed. Connection is another factor identified by self-determination theorists and concerns the social environment. Motivation tends to be reinforced for activities in which a person can positively relate to others, receives approval, and can reach out for help.

Reinforcement theory is based on behaviorism and explains motivation in relation to positive and negative outcomes of previous behavior. It uses the principle of operant conditioning, which states that behavior followed by positive consequences is more likely to be repeated, while behavior followed by negative consequences is less likely to be repeated. This theory predicts, for example, that if an aggressive behavior of a child is rewarded then this will reinforce the child's motivation for aggressive behavior in the future.

== In various fields ==
=== Neurology ===
In neurology, motivation is studied from a physiological perspective by examining the brain processes and brain areas involved in motivational phenomena. Neurology uses data from both humans and animals, which it obtains through a variety of methods, including the use of functional magnetic resonance imaging and positron emission tomography. It investigates regular motivational processes, pathological cases, and the effect of possible treatments. It is a complex discipline that relies on insights from fields like clinical, experimental, and comparative psychology.

Neurologists understand motivation as a multifaceted phenomenon that integrates and processes signals to make complex decisions and coordinate actions. Motivation is influenced by the organism's physiological state, like stress, information about the environment, and personal history, like past experiences with this environment. All this information is integrated to perform a cost–benefit analysis, which considers the time, effort, and discomfort associated with pursuing a goal as well as positive outcomes, like fulfilling one's needs or escaping harm. This form of reward prediction is associated with several brain areas, like the orbitofrontal cortex, the anterior cingulate, and the basolateral amygdala. The dopamine system plays a key role in learning which positive and negative outcomes are associated with a specific behavior and how certain signals, like environmental cues, are related to specific goals. Through these associations, motivation can automatically arise when the signals are present. For example, if a person associates having a certain type of food with a specific time of day then they may automatically feel motivated to eat this food when the time arrives.

=== Education ===
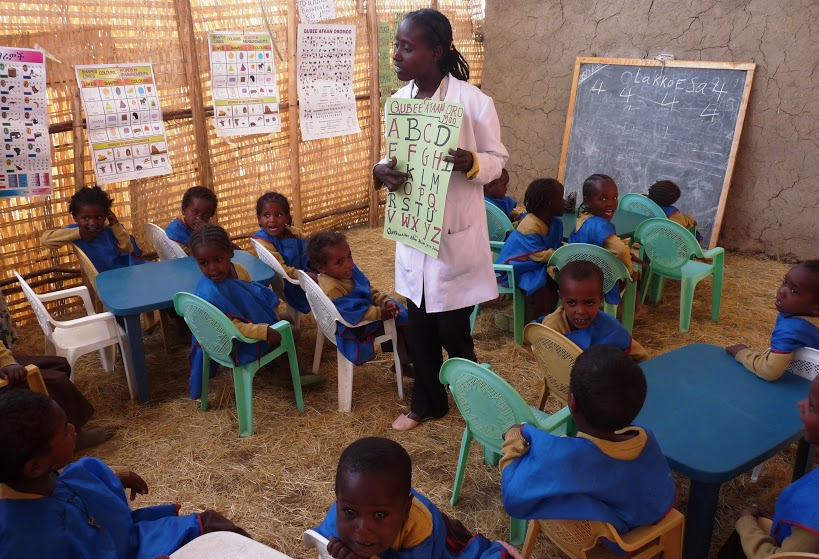
Motivation affects students' participation in classroom activities and academic success.

Motivation plays a key role in education since it affects the students' engagement with the studied topic and shapes their learning experience and academic success. Motivated students are more likely to participate in classroom activities and persevere through challenges. One of the responsibilities of educators and educational institutions is to establish a learning environment that fosters and sustains students' motivation to ensure effective learning.

Educational research is particularly interested in understanding the different effects that intrinsic and extrinsic motivation have on the learning process. In the case of intrinsic motivation, students are interested in the subject and the learning experience itself. Students driven by extrinsic motivation seek external rewards, like good grades or peer recognition. Intrinsic motivation is often seen as the preferred type of motivation since it is associated with more in-depth learning, better memory retention, and long-term commitment. Extrinsic motivation in the form of rewards and recognition also plays a key role in the learning process. However, it can conflict with intrinsic motivation in some cases and may then hinder creativity.

Various factors influence student motivation. It is usually beneficial to have an organized classroom with few distractions. The learning material should be neither too easy, which threatens to bore students, nor too difficult, which can lead to frustration. The behavior of the teacher also has a significant impact on student motivation, for example, in regard to how the material is presented, the feedback they provide on assignments, and the interpersonal relation they build with the students. Teachers who are patient and supportive can encourage interaction by interpreting mistakes as learning opportunities.

=== Work ===
Work motivation is an often-studied topic in the fields of organization studies and organizational behavior. They aim to understand human motivation in the context of organizations and investigate its role in work and work-related activities including human resource management, employee selection, training, and managerial practices. Motivation plays a key role in the workplace on various levels. It impacts how employees feel about their work, their level of determination, commitment, and overall job satisfaction. It also affects employee performance and overall business success. Lack of motivation can lead to decreased productivity due to complacency, disinterest, and absenteeism. According to a 2024 Gallup report, 8.9 trillion dollars were lost in global GDP due to low engagement. It can also manifest in the form of occupational burnout.

Various factors influence work motivation. They include the personal needs and expectations of the employees, the characteristics of the tasks they perform, and whether the work conditions are perceived as fair and just. Another key aspect is how managers communicate and provide feedback. Understanding and managing employee motivation is essential for managers to ensure effective leadership, employee performance, and business success. Cultural differences can have a significant impact on how to motivate workers. For example, workers from economically advanced countries may respond better to higher-order goals like self-actualization while the fulfillment of more basic needs tends to be more central for workers from less economically developed countries.

There are different approaches to increasing employee motivation. Some focus on material benefits, like high salary, health care, stock ownership plans, profit-sharing, and company cars. Others aim to make changes to the design of the job itself. For example, overly simplified and segmented jobs tend to result in decreased productivity and lower employee morale. The dynamics of motivation differ between paid work and volunteer work. Intrinsic motivation plays a larger role for volunteers with key motivators being self-esteem, the desire to help others, career advancement, and self-improvement.

=== Sport ===
Motivation is a fundamental aspect of sports. It affects how consistently athletes train, how much effort they are willing to invest, and how well they persevere through challenges. Proper motivation is an influential factor for athletic success. It concerns both the long-term motivation needed to sustain progress and commitment over an extended period as well as the short-term motivation required to mobilize as much energy as possible for a high performance on the same day.

It is the responsibility of coaches not just to advise and instruct athletes on training plans and strategies but also to motivate them to put in the required effort and give their best. There are different coaching styles and the right approach may depend on the personalities of the coach, the athlete, and the group as well as the general athletic situation. Some styles focus on realizing a particular goal while others concentrate on teaching, following certain principles, or building a positive interpersonal relationship.

=== Criminal law ===
The motive of a crime is a key aspect in criminal law. It refers to reasons that the accused had for committing a crime. Motives are often used as evidence to demonstrate why the accused might have committed the crime and how they would benefit from it. The absence of a motive can be used as evidence to put the accused's involvement in the crime into doubt. For example, financial gain is a motive to commit a crime from which the perpetrator would financially benefit, like embezzlement.

As a technical term, motive is distinguished from intent. Intent is the mental state of the defendant and belongs to mens rea. A motive is a reason that tempts a person to form an intent. Unlike intent, motive is usually not an essential element of a crime: it plays various roles in investigative considerations but is normally not required to establish the defendant's guilt.

In a different sense, motivation also plays a role in justifying why convicted offenders should be punished. According to the deterrence theory of law, one key aspect of punishment for law violation is to motivate both the convicted individual and potential future wrongdoers to not engage in similar criminal behavior.

=== Others ===
Motivation is a central factor in implementing and maintaining lifestyle changes in the fields of personal development and health. Personal development is a process of self-improvement aimed at enhancing one's skills, knowledge, talents, and overall well-being. It is realized through practices that promote growth and improve different areas in one's life. Motivation is pivotal in engaging in these practices. It is especially relevant to ensure long-term commitment and to follow through with one's plans. For example, health-related lifestyle changes may at times require high willpower and self-control to implement meaningful adjustments while resisting impulses and bad habits. This is the case when trying to resist urges to smoke, consume alcohol, and eat fattening food.

Motivation plays a key role in economics since it is what drives individuals and organizations to make economic decisions and engage in economic activities. It affects diverse processes involving consumer behavior, labor supply, and investment decisions. For example, rational choice theory, a fundamental theory in economics, postulates that individuals are motivated by self-interest and aim to maximize their utility, which guides economic behavior like consumption choices.

In video games, player motivation is what drives people to play a game and engage with its contents. Player motivation often revolves around completing certain objectives, like solving a puzzle, beating an enemy, or exploring the game world. It concerns both smaller objectives within a part of the game as well as finishing the game as a whole. Understanding different types of player motivation helps game designers make their games immersive and appealing to a wide audience.

Motivation is also relevant in the field of politics. This is true specifically for democracies to ensure active engagement, participation, and voting.

== See also ==
- 3C-model
- Amotivational syndrome
- Boredom
- Demotivation
- Depression (mood)
- Effects of hormones on sexual motivation
- Employee engagement
- Enthusiasm
- Frustration
- Happiness at work
- Health action process approach
- Hedonic motivation
- Humanistic psychology
- I-Change Model
- Incentives
- Laziness
- Learned industriousness
- Motivation crowding theory
- Motivational poster
- Nucleus accumbens
- Positive education
- Positive psychology in the workplace
- Procrastination
- Rat race
- Regulatory focus theory
- Rubicon model (psychology)
- Striatum
- Work engagement
