= Double demotivation =

Double demotivation is a theory involving pay and motivation first postulated by S.C. Carr and MacLachlan. Double demotivation hypothesises that pay discrepancies decrease work motivation among both lower and higher paid individuals who essentially perform the same task. Compared with equitably paid workers, employees who felt they were being under- or overpaid reported lower job satisfaction and greater readiness to change jobs.

== See also ==
- Melvin J. Lerner's just world theory
- J Stacy Adams' equity theory
- Work psychology
