= Demotivation =

Loss of motivation caused by specific external influences

In the study of motivation, demotivation is the weakening or loss of an existing motivation to act as a result of specific negative influences. The concept has been elaborated chiefly in educational research and applied linguistics (at the same time, the term is rarely used in mainstream motivational psychology); Zoltán Dörnyei and Ema Ushioda define it as the effect of "specific external forces that reduce or diminish the motivational basis" of a behavioural intention or an ongoing action. The term also can be found in business and management writing, with loose or absent definitions, and in clinical psychology, where it designates much more severe disorders of diminished motivation, including the amotivational syndrome and avolition.

== Concept ==
A demotivated individual is the one originally motivated but losing his or her commitment due to an external reason; the negative influences responsible are termed "demotives", the counterparts of motives (a motive is behind the will to act, a demotive lowers it). Not every negative influence qualifies as a demotive: Dörnyei and Ushioda exclude three cases: attractive alternative actions that merely distract from an activity (their effect stems from presenting a more appealing option rather than from reducing motivation towards the original one), the gradual loss of interest in a long-lasting activity, and the purely internal realisation (without an external trigger) that the eventual cost of reaching the goal is unacceptable. Demotivation does not imply elimination of every reason for acting; it may simply be strong enough to outweigh them.

Demotivation is distinguished from "amotivation", a construct of Deci and Ryan's self-determination theory. Amotivation denotes a lack of motivation arising from unrealistic outcome expectations (feelings of incompetence or helplessness in the face of a task), whereas demotivation is caused by particular external causes; some demotives can nevertheless produce general amotivation towards an activity (e.g., a series of them can reduce self-efficacy).

== Research in instructional communication ==
According to Dörnyei and Ushioda, the only systematic line of research on demotivation outside language education has been conducted in instructional communication, a subfield of (first-language) communication studies focused on classroom interaction. Two investigations by Christophel and Gorham of American college students found that two-thirds of the reported sources of demotivation can be attributed to the teacher's actions; the most frequently mentioned categories included issues with grading and assignments, boring or unprepared teaching, aversion to the subject area, poorly organised material, and unapproachable or condescending teachers. Teachers who displayed "immediacy" behaviours (verbal and non-verbal behaviours reducing the distance between teacher and students) were mentioned significantly less often in connection with demotivation. A cross-cultural study of college classrooms in China, Germany, Japan and the United States (Zhang, 2007) confirmed correlation between teacher behavior and student demotivation, teacher incompetence being the main culprit.

== Second-language learning ==
Demotivation has attracted particular attention in second-language (L2) motivation research, a field in which learning failure is unusually common; as of the early 2010s, however, it remained an under-researched area. Longitudinal and cross-sectional studies of the 1990s and 2000s consistently found a general pattern of declining motivation among language students as the excitement of starting on a new subject fades while cognitive and social pressures grow.

Early empirical studies of L2 demotivation broadly paralleled the instructional communication findings. A content analysis of American students' essays by Rebecca Oxford identified the teacher's relationship with students, the teacher's attitude towards the course, teacher–student style conflicts, and the nature of classroom activities as the main themes, with both excessively autocratic and excessively "laissez-faire" teaching perceived as demotivating. In Dörnyei's interview study of fifty secondary school pupils in Budapest identified as particularly demotivated, teacher-related factors (personality, commitment, competence, teaching method) accounted for the largest share of primary demotives, followed by inadequate school facilities, reduced self-confidence, and a negative attitude towards the language itself. Chambers's questionnaire study of English secondary pupils, by contrast, found the students' likes and dislikes inconclusive, and noted that the participating teachers located the causes of demotivation everywhere but in themselves.

Later research, much of it conducted in Japan, has complicated the picture. In Sakai and Kikuchi's factor-analytic survey of Japanese senior high school students, learning contents and materials, and test scores, rather than teacher variables, showed the highest demotivation ratings, prompting the question of whether demotivation implicates internal as well as external forces. Falout, Elwood and Hood's study of 900 Japanese university students of English suggested that internal and reactive factors (such as self-denigration and enjoyment-seeking) may affect the outcomes more severely than the external factors, with less able learners more prone to respond to failure with self-denigration and have a harder time self-regulating their emotional state.

At the level of the broader sociocultural context, several researchers have linked demotivation in foreign language learning to the discourses surrounding Global English. Coleman connects low motivation for foreign language learning in Britain to monolingualism and insularity; similar concerns about motivation for languages other than English have been raised in Japan, Scandinavia and Hungary.

== Business and management ==
Peter Sandiford and Peter Diver state that the term is common in management academic literature, yet is often left undefined or defined inconsistently. Mayer analysed demotivation at work as a damaging process unfolding in six phases (running from confusion and anger through subconscious hope, disillusionment and uncooperativeness to eventual departure from the organisation) and treated it as a sign of unrest; Sandiford and Divers object that unrest would indicate strong motivation, not the lack thereof. Küpers defined it as "a reduced driving force for thinking, feeling or acting", but also used the term to describe the drive to counterproductive ends. Sandiford and Divers regard this as a switch from reduced motivation to a quite motivated behaviour considered undesirable. Grubišić and Goić used the term demotivation in three meanings: absence of motivation, negative motivation, and motivation not to act). Sandiford and Divers find these definitions self-contradictory, as the latter two senses describe concern with the direction of motivation, not its absence. Of the definitions surveyed, they consider Spitzer's more defensible: he identified seven recurring workplace demotivators (minor everyday frustrations that lead employees to scale back the effort they invest in their jobs), which at least involves external factors reducing overall activity.

Sandiford and Divers argue that the managerial usage is not merely imprecise but conceptually mistaken and potentially harmful. A worker written off as demotivated is, on their account, typically motivated towards something else (daydreaming, leaving early, gossip, or outright resistance and sabotage), so that a more productive question for managers is why the worker is motivated in that direction, not why he or she fails to be motivated as the manager expects; the label of demotivation thus becomes a way of blaming poor performance on supposedly deficient inner drive rather than on ineffective management.

== Clinical psychology ==
The educational and managerial usages differ from the concept's meaning in clinical psychology. Hazif-Thomas and colleagues, writing on elderly and demented patients, treat demotivation as a severe syndrome: a loss of motivation sliding into apathy, the extinction of feeling, emotion and interest in engaging with one's surroundings.

== See also ==
- Double demotivation at workplace
- 3C-model, a particular demotivation model

== Sources ==
- Dörnyei, Zoltán; Ushioda, Ema (2013). Teaching and Researching: Motivation (2nd ed.). Routledge. pp. 138–155. ISBN 978-1-317-86282-6.
- Sandiford, Peter; Divers, Peter (13–15 September 2011). Demotivation as a problematic concept in business and management (PDF). British Academy of Management Annual Conference. Aston University, Birmingham.
