= Equity theory =

Management concept

In management studies and in social policy, equity theory focuses on determining whether the distribution of resources is fair. Equity is measured by comparing the ratio of contributions (or costs) and benefits (or rewards) for each person within an organization or social context. Considered one of the justice theories, equity theory was first developed in the 1960s by John Stacey Adams, a workplace and behavioral psychologist, who asserted that employees seek to maintain equity between the inputs that they bring to a job and the outcomes that they receive from it against the perceived inputs and outcomes of others. According to Equity Theory, in order to maximize individuals' rewards, we tend to create systems where resources can be fairly divided amongst members of a group. Inequalities in relationships will cause those within it to be unhappy to a degree proportional to the amount of inequality. The belief is that people value fair treatment which causes them to be motivated to keep the fairness maintained within the relationships of their co-workers and the organization. The structure of equity in the workplace is based on the ratio of inputs to outcomes. Inputs are the contributions made by the employee for the organization. The theory can also be applied in a wider social context.

== Background ==
Equity theory stems from Social Exchange Theory. It proposes that individuals who perceive themselves as either under-rewarded or over-rewarded will experience distress, and that this distress leads to efforts to restore equity within the relationship. Equity is measured by comparing the ratios of contributions and benefits of each person within the relationship. Partners do not have to receive equal benefits (such as receiving the same amount of love, care, and financial security) or make equal contributions (such as investing the same amount of effort, time, and financial resources), as long as the ratio between these benefits and contributions is similar. Much like other prevalent theories of motivation, such as Maslow’s hierarchy of needs, equity theory acknowledges that subtle and variable individual factors affect each person's assessment and perception of their relationship with their relational partners. According to Adams in 1965, anger is induced by underpayment inequity and guilt is induced with overpayment equity. Payment, whether hourly wage or salary, is the main concern and therefore the cause of equity or inequity in most cases.

In any position, an employee wants to feel that their contributions and work performance are being rewarded with their pay. If an employee feels underpaid then it will result in the employee feeling hostile towards the organization and perhaps their co-workers, which may result in the employee not performing well at work anymore. It is the subtle variables that also play an important role in the feeling of equity. Just the idea of recognition for the job performance and the mere act of thanking the employee will cause a feeling of satisfaction and therefore help the employee feel worthwhile and have better outcomes. Employees can also feel positive inequity which may cause the worker to feel guilty and attempt to compensate for those feelings of guilt.

=== Definition of equity ===
Individuals compare their job inputs and outcomes with those of others and then respond to eliminate any perceived inequities. Referent comparisons. This can include compensation, promotions, how hard or long they work.

=== Inputs and outcomes ===
==== Inputs ====
Inputs are defined as each participant’s contributions to the relational exchange and are viewed as entitling them to rewards or costs. The inputs that a participant contributes to a relationship can be either assets – entitling them to rewards – or liabilities - entitling them to costs. The entitlement to rewards or costs ascribed to each input vary depending on the relational setting. In industrial settings, assets such as capital and manual labor are seen as "relevant inputs" – inputs that legitimately entitle the contributor to rewards. In social settings, assets such as physical beauty and kindness are generally seen as assets entitling the possessor to social rewards. Individual traits such as boorishness and cruelty are seen as liabilities entitling the possessor to costs. Inputs typically include any of the following:

- Time
- Education
- Εxperience
- Effort
- Loyalty
- Hard Work
- Commitment
- Ability
- Adaptability
- Tolerance
- Determination
- Enthusiasm
- Personal sacrifice
- Trust in supervisors
- Support from co-workers and colleagues
- Skill

==== Outcomes ====
Outputs are defined as the positive and negative consequences that an individual perceives a participant has incurred as a consequence of their relationship with another. When the ratio of inputs to outputs is close, then the employee should have much satisfaction with their job. Outputs can be both tangible and intangible. Typical outputs include any of the following:

- Job security
- Salary
- Employee benefit
- Expenses
- Recognition
- Reputation
- Responsibility
- Sense of achievement
- Praise
- Thanks
- Stimuli

=== Propositions ===
Equity theory consists of four propositions:

- self-inside: Individuals seek to maximize their outcomes (where outcomes are defined as rewards minus costs).
- self-outside: Groups can maximize collective rewards by developing accepted systems for equitably apportioning rewards and costs among members. Systems of equity will evolve within groups, and members will attempt to induce other members to accept and adhere to these systems. The only way groups can induce members to equitably behave is by making it more profitable to behave equitably than inequitably. Thus, groups will generally reward members who treat others equitably and generally punish (increase the cost for) members who treat others inequitably.
- others-inside: When individuals find themselves participating in inequitable relationships, they become distressed. The more inequitable the relationship, the more distress individuals feel. According to equity theory, both the person who gets "too much" and the person who gets "too little" feel distressed. The person who gets too much may feel guilt or shame. The person who gets too little may feel angry or humiliated.
- other-outside: Individuals who perceive that they are in an inequitable relationship attempt to eliminate their distress by restoring equity. The greater the inequity, the more distress people feel and the more they try to restore equity.

== Practical applications ==
=== Business ===
Equity theory has been widely applied to business settings by industrial psychologists to describe the relationship between an employee's motivation and their perception of equitable or inequitable treatment. In a business setting, the relevant dyadic relationship is that between employee and employer. As in marriage and other contractual dyadic relationships, equity theory assumes that employees seek to maintain an equitable ratio between the inputs they bring to the relationship and the outcomes they receive from it. Equity theory in business, however, introduces the concept of social comparison, whereby employees evaluate their own input/output ratios based on their comparison with the input/outcome ratios of other employees. Inputs in this context include the employee’s time, expertise, qualifications, experience, intangible personal qualities such as drive and ambition, and interpersonal skills. Outcomes include monetary compensation, perquisites ("perks"), benefits, and flexible work arrangements which impact motivation, performance, and satisfaction of workers. Employees who perceive inequity will seek to reduce it, either by distorting inputs and/or outcomes in their own minds ("cognitive distortion"), directly altering inputs and/or outcomes, or leaving the organization. Workers will change the quality of their work based on their perceived compensation. These perceptions of inequity are perceptions of organizational justice, or more specifically, injustice. Subsequently, the theory has wide-reaching implications for employee morale, efficiency, productivity, and turnover.

The three primary assumptions applied to most business applications of equity theory can be summarized as follows:

1. Employees expect a fair return for what they contribute to their jobs, a concept referred to as the "equity norm".
2. Employees determine what their equitable return should be after comparing their inputs and outcomes with those of their co-workers. This concept is referred to as "social comparison".
3. Employees who perceive themselves as being in an inequitable situation will seek to reduce the inequity either by distorting inputs and/or outcomes in their own minds ("cognitive distortion"), by directly altering inputs and/or outputs, or by leaving the organization.

=== Personal relationships ===
Equity theory has also been applied to intimate relationships. Kurt notes that "the theory holds broader social importance, as it offers a framework for promoting fairness and justice in interpersonal interactions and relationships. By doing so, it aims to guide the regulation of both organisational outcomes and social justice".

Scholars address the notion that intimate relationships also exemplify equity theory in action because partners evaluate the fairness of their inputs and outputs. According to scholars, equity theory may explain how individuals choose their partner and the functionality of the relationship This concept has been applied to exploitative relationships, reciprocal relationships, and altruistic relationships. Further, scholars state that equity theory explains that inequalities in the relationship can lead to feelings of distress and depression.

== Implications for managers ==
Equity theory has several implications for business managers:

- People measure the totals of their inputs and outcomes. This means a working mother may accept lower monetary compensation in return for more flexible working hours.
- Different employees ascribe personal values to inputs and outcomes. Thus, two employees of equal experience and qualification performing the same work for the same pay may have quite different perceptions of the fairness of the deal.
- Employees are able to adjust for purchasing power and local market conditions. Thus a teacher from Alberta may accept lower compensation than his colleague in Toronto if his cost of living is different, while a teacher in a remote African village may accept a totally different pay structure.
- Although it may be acceptable for more senior staff to receive higher compensation, there are limits to the balance of the scales of equity and employees can find excessive executive pay demotivating.
- Staff perceptions of inputs and outcomes of themselves and others may be incorrect, and perceptions need to be managed effectively.
- An employee who believes he is overcompensated may increase his effort. However he may also adjust the values that he ascribes to his own personal inputs. It may be that he or she internalizes a sense of superiority and actually decrease his efforts.

== Criticisms and related theories ==
Criticism has been directed toward both the assumptions and practical application of equity theory by people such as Leventhal who assert that Equity Theory is too unidimensional, ignores procedure, and overestimates how important the concept of fairness is in social interactions. Scholars have questioned the simplicity of the model, arguing that a number of demographic and psychological variables affect people's perceptions of fairness and interactions with others. Furthermore, much of the research supporting the basic propositions of equity theory has been conducted in laboratory settings, and thus has questionable applicability to real-world situations. Critics have also argued that people might perceive equity/inequity not only in terms of the specific inputs and outcomes of a relationship, but also in terms of the overarching system that determines those inputs and outputs. Thus, in a business setting, one might feel that their compensation is equitable to other employees', but one might view the entire compensation system as unfair.

Researchers have offered numerous magnifying and competing perspectives:

=== Equity sensitivity construct ===
The Equity Sensitivity Construct proposes that individuals has different preferences for equity and thus react in different ways to perceived equity and inequity. Preferences can be expressed on a continuum from preferences for extreme under-benefit to preferences for extreme over-benefit. Three archetypal classes are as follows:

- Benevolent individuals, those who prefer their own input/outcome ratios to be less than those of their relational partner. In other words, the benevolent prefers to be under-benefited.
- Equity Sensitives, those who prefer their own input/outcome ratios to be equal to those of their relational partner.
- Entitled individuals, those who prefer their own input/outcome ratios to exceed those of their relational partner. In other words, the entitled prefers to be over-benefited.

=== Fairness model ===
The Fairness Model proposes an alternative measure of equity/inequity to the relational partner or "comparison person" of standard equity theory. According to the Fairness Model, an individual judges the overall "fairness" of a relationship by comparing their inputs and outcomes with an internally derived standard. The Fairness Model thus allows for the perceived equity/inequity of the overarching system to be incorporated into individuals' evaluations of their relationships.

=== Game theory ===
Behavioral economics has recently started to apply game theory to the study of equity theory. For instance, Gill and Stone in 2010 analyze how considerations of equity influence behavior in strategic settings in which people compete and develop the implications for optimal labor contracts.

== See also ==
- Expectancy theory
- Social psychology
- Predicted outcome value theory
- Vulnerability and care theory of love
- Social exchange theory
- Game theory
- Self-expansion model
- Equity
- Identity management
- Relational dialectics
- Intergenerational equity
- Interpersonal deception theory

== Literature ==
- Adams, J. S. (1963). "Toward an understanding of inequity". Journal of Abnormal and Social Psychology. 67 (5): 422–436. doi:10.1037/h0040968. PMID 14081885.
- Gill, D.; Stone, R. (2010). "Fairness and desert in tournaments" (PDF). Games and Economic Behavior. 69 (2): 346–364. doi:10.1016/j.geb.2010.01.002.
- Guerrero, Laura K.; Andersen, Peter A.; Afifi, Walid A. (2010). Close Encounters: Communication in Relationships. SAGE Publications. ISBN 978-1-4129-7737-1.
- Huseman, R.C.; Hatfield, J.D.; Miles, E.W. (1987). "A New Perspective on Equity Theory: The Equity Sensitivity Construct". The Academy of Management Review. 12 (2): 222–234. doi:10.2307/258531. JSTOR 258531.
- Messick, D. & Cook, K. (1983). Equity theory: psychological and sociological perspectives. Praeger.
- Sankey, C.D., (1999). Assessing the employment exchanges of Business Educators in Arizona. Unpublished doctoral dissertation, Arizona State University.
- Spector, P.E. (2008). Industrial and Organizational Behavior (5th ed.). Hoboken, NJ: Wiley.
- Traupmann, J. (1978). A longitudinal study of equity in intimate relationships. Unpublished doctoral dissertation, University of Wisconsin.
- Walster, E., Walster G.W. & Bershcheid, E. (1978). Equity: Theory and Research. Allyn and Bacon, Inc.
- Walster, E.; Traupmann, J.; Walster, G.W. (1978). "Equity and Extramarital Sexuality". Archives of Sexual Behavior. 7 (2): 127–142. doi:10.1007/BF01542062. PMID 666565. S2CID 25148016.
