= Motivational intensity =

== Separation of motivational intensity and valence ==
In psychology, the term valence is used to describe stimuli, events, situations and emotional states that are intrinsically attractive (positively valenced) or intrinsically aversive (negatively valenced). The valence of a stimulus or event tells us whether we are likely to approach or avoid it. Valence, however provides no information about the strength of this tendency as it is either positive or negative. Instead, the strength of this association is quantified as the Motivational Intensity. By analogy, the valence of a stimulus or event is like the sign of a correlation coefficient and its motivational intensity is like the coefficient magnitude.

It has been suggested that valence ratings in normative data sets such as the International Affective Picture System (IAPS) might be used as proxies for motivational intensity. However, valence and motivational intensity do not always go hand in hand with one another. For example, viewing a positively valenced picture of a cute cat is associated with low motivational intensity because participants like it but are not intrinsically driven towards it. In contrast, viewing a positively valenced picture of a dessert is associated with high motivational intensity because participants want and desire it. Valence and motivational intensity can be at odds with one another with negatively valenced stimuli as well.

== Separation of motivational intensity and arousal ==
Motivational intensity and arousal are related, but are considered to be separate ideas; arousal has implications for action, but motivational intensity does not and it is possible to experience high levels of arousal, but not experience motivational intensity (e.g., laughing). Gable and Harmon-Jones asked participants’ to view pictures and then complete an attention task. Half of the participants pedaled on a stationary bicycle (to induce high arousal), while others did not. Results demonstrated that there was no difference in performance on the attention task with high or low levels of arousal, but pictures high in motivational intensity narrowed attention, compared to pictures that were low in motivational intensity.

== Motivational intensity, valence and attention ==
According to motivational intensity theory, high approach motivational intensity will narrow attention and conversely, low motivational intensity will broaden attention. This theory is at odds with a more traditional explanation of the effects of affect on cognitive scope, which suggest that positive affect broadens attention and negative affect narrows attention, respectively.

=== Measurement and manipulation of motivational intensity ===
Motivational intensity has been experimentally measured and manipulated in a variety of contexts as highlighted below.

==== Film clips ====
Gable and Harmon-Jones examined the effects of high and low motivational intensity on the scope of attention. Motivational intensity was manipulated using film clips. Half of the participants watched a film showing cats to induce low motivational intensity. Half of participants watched a film showing appetizing desserts to induce high motivational intensity. After watching the film, participants completed a Kimchi and Palmer task to measure their scope of attention. Results showed that participants experienced narrowing attention following the high, but not the low motivational intensity film.

==== Goals ====
Hart and Gable examined the effect of low and high motivational intensity on positive affect. Participants were either asked to write about a positive event where someone was kind to them to induce low motivational intensity, write down a goal they want to accomplish and the steps it will take to accomplish it to induce high motivational intensity, or write about a typical day in their life, as a neutral control condition. Results indicated that high motivational intensity positive affect lead to more successful goal pursuit and occurred only when task goals were explicitly stated. No effect occurred in the neutral condition, which suggests that motivational intensity alone did not impact goal pursuit.

==== Monetary incentive ====
Gable and Harmon-Jones have manipulated motivational intensity using a delayed monetary incentive paradigm. Gable and Harmon-Jones asked participants to respond to shapes that were presented on a computer screen. Half of the participants were told that participants could gain money when circles, but not squares appeared on the screen (pre-goal; high motivational intensity). Half of the participants were not given this instruction. Next, neutral words were presented either centrally or peripherally on the screen. Participants then completed a goal-related flanker task, where they were told that if they were faster than average on each trial, they could gain money on that trial (post-goal; low motivational intensity). Finally, participants’ memory for the words was tested. Results suggested that compared to the neutral condition, high motivational intensity (i.e., pre-goal) lead to better memory for centrally presented information and low motivational intensity (i.e., post-goal) lead to better memory for peripherally presented information. In Experiment 2, these effects were replicated using desirable (e.g., desserts) and neutral pictures.

==== Pictures ====
Pictures varying in high and low motivational intensity have been used in a variety of different studies including time perception. Poole & Gable asked participants to judge if pictures that were either high or low motivational intensity, appeared for long or short amount of time. Pictures were high (e.g., pictures of desserts), or low (e.g., pictures of flowers) in motivational intensity or neutral images (e.g., geometric shapes) and have been used in previous experiments to induce motivational intensity. Results demonstrated that participants’ perception of time was shorter when high motivational intensity pictures were presented compared to low motivational intensity or neutral pictures.

Gable and Harmon-Jones (Experiment 2) used a neutral picture (e.g. rocks) or a high motivational intensity picture (e.g., dessert) appeared followed by the Navon letter task to measure attentional scope. Results indicated that participants’ attention was narrowed following the high motivational intensity pictures, compared to the low motivational intensity pictures.

Gable and Harmon-Jones (Experiment 3) first measured overall approach motivation of participants using Carver and White's (1994) Behavioral Inhibition Scale and Behavioral Activation Scales. Participants were presented with the dessert pictures used in Experiment 2 to induce high motivational intensity and baby pictures to induce low motivational intensity. Results showed that participants with higher behavioral activation scores in the beginning of the experiment showed more evidence of attentional narrowing following high motivational intensity pictures of desserts.

Gable and Harmon-Jones (Experiment 4) manipulated motivational intensity using pictures and participant's expectancy to act. Participant's viewed high motivational intensity pictures (e.g., desserts) or neutral pictures (e.g., paper plates) and half of the participants who viewed the high motivational intensity pictures of desserts were given the expectation that they would eat the desserts later, while the other half were not. Following the viewing of the pictures, participants completed the Navon letters task to measure the scope of attention. Results suggested that participant's attention narrowed the most when they viewed high motivational intensity pictures and were expected to consume them. This expectancy to consume the desserts showed further narrowing of attention than viewing high motivational intensity pictures alone.

Gable and Harmon-Jones induced motivational intensity using photos from the International Affective Picture System. Pictures were negative or neutral. One picture was presented followed by one trial of the Navon letters task to measure scope of attention. Results showed participants attention was broadened following low motivational intensity pictures, compared to the neutral picture. Experiment 2 was identical to experiment 1, but pictures high motivational intensity negative pictures were used. Results showed a narrowing of attention following these types of pictures.

Liu and Wang used the same high and low motivational intensity pictures used in previous studies along with neutral pictures to examine the effects of motivational intensity on cognitive flexibility. Results showed that low motivational intensity increased cognitive flexibility and high motivational intensity reduced flexibility.

Neuropsychological measures have been used in previous research to measure participant's neurological responses while they view high and low motivational intensity pictures

== See also ==
- Affect (psychology)#Motivational intensity and cognitive scope
- Reinforcement sensitivity theory
