= 3C-model =

The 3C-model of motivation ("3C" stands for the "three components of motivation") was developed by professor Hugo M. Kehr of UC Berkeley. The 3C-model is an integrative, empirically validated theory of motivation that can be used for systematic motivation diagnosis and intervention.

== Main assumptions ==
=== The three components head, heart and hand ===
"3C" stands for the three components of motivation, which can be illustrated as three partially overlapping circles (see Fig. 1). In psychological terminology, the three components are explicit (self-attributed) motives, implicit (unconscious) motives, and perceived abilities. For practical applications, the metaphor "head", "heart" and "hand", which goes back to Johann Heinrich Pestalozzi, is being used.

- Head represents our rationally derived intentions, our goals and the commitment to enact a certain action.
- Heart represents the emotional sphere; the fun and pleasure associated with an activity; unconscious needs and motives, but also fears and bellyaches underlying an activity.
- Hand represents skills and abilities, action-related knowledge and experiences with respect to the activity at hand.

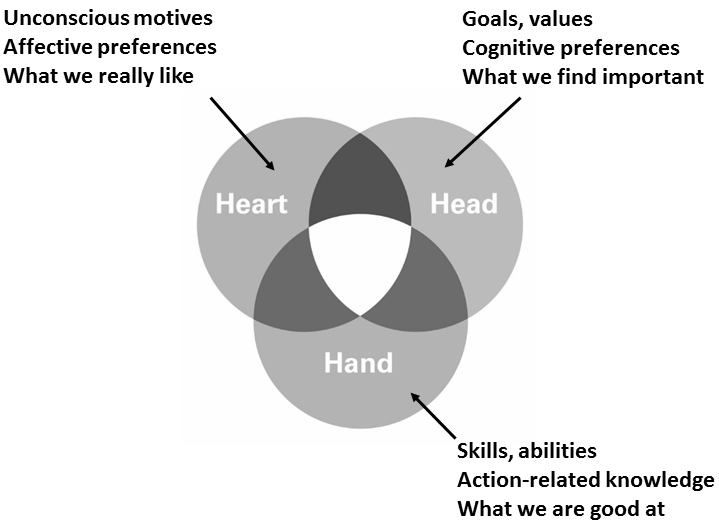
Fig. 1. Illustration of the three components of the 3C-model head, heart and hand.

=== Interplay of the three components ===
Fulfilment of the components head and heart results in intrinsic motivation: The person is fully concentrated and likes to perform the activity at hand. Hereby, it does not matter whether the component hand is also fulfilled: Skills and abilities are not a prerequisite for intrinsic motivation.

Optimal motivation results from all three components being fulfilled (represented by the overlap section of the three circles in Figure 1). Here, the person is intrinsically motivated and also has all the skills and abilities needed. This situation is associated with the experience of flow. However, if one of the two components head or heart is not fulfilled (i.e., the person is lacking cognitive support for the activity or experiences unpleasant belly-aches), the person will struggle when performing the activity. This situation may be experienced as "demotivation". Here, willpower (volition) is needed in order to perform the activity and suppress aversion or doubt. Volitional self-control can be momentarily successful – but it also induces a loss of energy and can, in the long run, lead to over-control and health problems.

Two kinds of volition need to be distinguished: Volition Type 1 is needed for tasks which are supported by the head but lack support from the heart. This is the case, for instance, when important, but aversive tasks need to be fulfilled. Volition Type 2 is needed for tasks that are supported by the heart but not the head; such situations may be experienced as temptation or fear.

Lacking support by the component hand requires problem-solving mechanisms to compensate one's lacking skills and abilities, for instance by asking others for help.

== Application of the 3C-Model ==
In practical application, for instance in self-management, in coaching, in leadership training, or in change management, the 3C-model can be used for systematic diagnosis of motivation deficits and intervention.

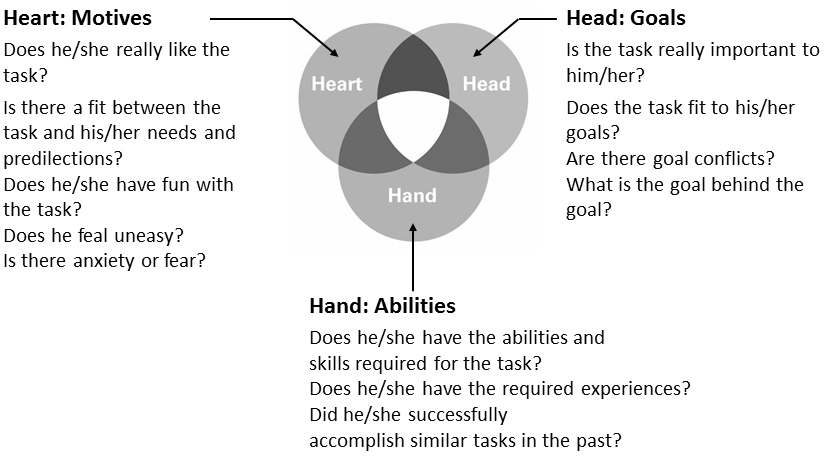
Fig. 2. Practical application of the 3C-model: Motivation diagnosis (e.g. of a team member/ an employee).

=== Motivation diagnosis ===
For diagnostic purposes, fulfilment of the three components of motivation can be assessed with the so-called 3C-check. The following questions can be used (see Figure 2):

- Head: "Is this activity really important to me?"
- Heart: "Do I really like this activity?"
- Hand: "Am I good at this activity?"

Based on the answers to these questions, appropriate support can be sought (see Figure 3).

=== Intervention ===
Interventions based on the 3C-check can best be illustrated with an example. Let us assume a sales manager has performed a 3C-check with her sales representative with respect to a guided sales pitch.

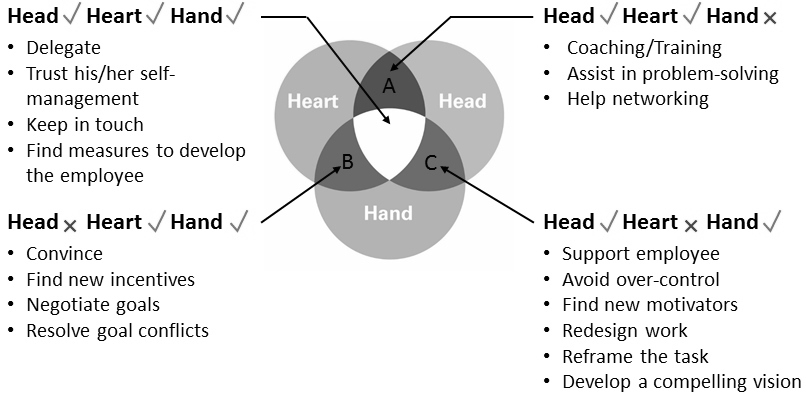
Fig. 3. Practical application of the 3C-model: Intervention in case of motivation deficits.

If the 3C-check shows that the sales pitch in use is supported by the components head and heart, but not the component hand (this combination is represented by Section A in Fig. 3), it should first be discussed whether the lack of skill and ability is only subjective (i.e., felt by the sales representative) or also objective. In case of an objective skill and ability deficit, (e.g., when the co-worker is not yet familiar with the guidelines or the calculation methods used), measures like training, coaching, or collegial advice may be appropriate. Moreover, other colleagues may be asked to assist the sales representative and help overcome the hand-related obstacle. In case of a subjective skill and ability deficit, the manager could try to increase the sales representative's self-efficacy by providing positive feedback about her employee's prior performance.

The 3C-check might also reveal lacking support by the components head (represented by sector B in Fig. 3): The sales representative may not be convinced, that the guided sales pitch in use is instrumental, or she prefers other sales channels. Here, the supervisor is well advised to try to increase her employee's cognitive support. For instance, she could convince her with arguments, set extrinsic rewards (e.g., a bonus) or solve goal conflicts by reprioritizing goals.

But what if the 3C-check shows that the components head and hand are fulfilled, but not the component heart (represented by sector C in Fig. 3)? That is if the sales representative finds the task important and instrumental and has all the required skills and abilities, but still does not like her task?

Perhaps she does not like following the rigid sales pitch guideline, she may not like to visit customers at home, or she may be anxious to receive a negative response from her customers. Here, her manager is well-advised to not ignore her lacking emotional support but to seek possible solutions. She could try to modify the task so that it better matches her employee's underlying motives or to find motive-congruent incentives. Kehr and von Rosenstiel call this "metamotivation". For example, if her employee's has a strong need for affiliation, she could try to preferably allocate uncomplicated, friendly customers to her, or to organize the sales pitch as a team event. In addition, the manager could assist her employee in finding a personal vision which matches her employees motives. These measures, if successful, arouse the component heart and increase one's emotional support. Otherwise, the managers may consult her sales representative in finding effective volitional strategies to overcome her motivational barriers. Kehr und von Rosenstiel call this "metavolition". Here, it seems advisable to reduce overcontrol (e.g., negative fantasies, excessive impulse control, too much planning) and rather motivate oneself by reframing (positive fantasies) or by changing aversive framework conditions, for instance by conducting the sales pitch in a neutral environment.

If the 3C-check shows support from all three components (represented by the overlap section of the three circles in Fig. 3), the manager can delegate the task to her co-worker and trust her co-worker's self-management. However, she might still want to keep in touch with her employee and be wary that the boundary conditions could become aversive or her co-workers motivation might change. Further, the manager should also consider future challenges for her co-worker.

== Scientific background ==
=== Development ===
Initially, the 3C-model was published as the "compensatory model of work motivation and volition". The original title referred to one of the central assumptions of the model, namely that volition compensates for insufficient motivation. Because of the potential confusion with "worker compensation", however, the name was changed to "3C-model." The notion of three independent components of motivation is based on McClellands differentiation of "motives, skills, and values".

=== Empirical research ===
The 3C-model has attracted considerable empirical research conducted at LMU Munich, UC Berkeley, MGSM in Sydney and the Technical University of Munich, amongst others. An overview of the research regarding the 3C-model is given by Kehr (2014). Key results are:

Certain education styles are conducive for the development of discrepancies between head and heart, so-called motive discrepancies.

Discrepancies between head and heart impair well-being and lead to burnout.

Discrepancies between head and heart reduce one's willpower.

Fear motives, e.g. fear of rejection, reduce one's willpower and well-being.

Flow results from all three components of the 3C-model being fulfilled.

== Literature ==
- Kehr, H. M. (2004). Integrating implicit motives, explicit motives, and perceived abilities: The compensatory model of work motivation and volition. Academy of Management Review, 29(3), 479–499.
