= Construal =

Concept in social psychology

In social psychology, a construal is a way that people perceive, comprehend, and interpret their world, particularly the acts of others toward them.

Researchers and theorists within virtually every sub-discipline of psychology have acknowledged the relevance of a subjective construal, especially with regard to the concepts of the false consensus effect and the fundamental attribution error. There is a difference between self-construal and construal in a social atmosphere. While self-construal is a perception of the self, the latter is a perception of one's surroundings. Construal plays a crucial role when one lacks the knowledge to correctly deal with a situation.

== Major theoretical approaches ==
The concept of construal is not a new one, and the components of construal can be seen in the works of many past psychologists including Kurt Lewin's recognition of the importance of a subjective reality and its effect on one's personal significance; Kurt Koffka's theories of gestalt psychology; Brunswik's emphasis on subjective distinction; Murray's discussion of "beta press"; Kelly's account of personal constructs; Merleau-Ponty's reference to personal situations; and more recent discussions by personality theorists such as Endler and Pervin. Construal used to be viewed as an obstruction in one's perception of the world, but has evolved into a mechanism used to explain how or why people think the way they do.

Cognitive psychologists have been perhaps the most preoccupied with the idea of construal. This is evident in their emphasis on a human's formation of schemas "that help perceivers to resolve ambiguity, fill in the gaps, and generally perceive predictability and coherence." They focus on the idea that we rely on other sources to form our ideas of our surroundings.

Solomon Asch presented an important concept in construal theory when he stated, "that the very meaning of a message can change as a function of the source to which it is attributed." His most classic example is the effect of the phrase "a little rebellion…is a good thing." This statement coming from Thomas Jefferson has a different meaning to the recipient than it does coming from V.I. Lenin. The meaning of the statement is dependent on not only who says it, but also on how the recipient of the message interprets it.

There are three major sources of construal in human beings: the need to feel good about ourselves, the need to be accurate, and the need to belong. The American social psychologist Leon Festinger was one of the first to acknowledge that these needs may not always coincide (see cognitive dissonance). The Austrian social psychologist Fritz Heider described the concept of construal when he said, "Generally, a person reacts to what he thinks the other person is perceiving, feeling, and thinking, in addition to what the other person may be doing." In other words, a person bases his or her opinions and actions on the opinions and action of everybody else.

For example, take this situation into consideration:

Christopher likes Samantha and wants to ask her to the school prom. He is shy and concerned that Samantha may respond negatively. A social psychologist observes not only Samantha's behavior towards Christopher, but also how Christopher perceives and interprets her behavior toward him. An objective observer may perceive Samantha's smiling as friendly, but Christopher may think that she is laughing at something in his appearance, and as a result, he might not invite her.

Contemporary views on construal include the concepts of naïve realism, the accessibility principle, and a focus on the idea of self-construal. Lee Ross's concept of naïve realism is especially important in the context of construal. It is the conviction all of us have that we perceive things how they really are. Essentially, people acknowledge the fact that others experience the effects of construal, but personally think that they form their own thoughts without being affected by construal. Being blinded by this process often leads people to commit the fundamental attribution error. Similar to Asch's theory, the accessibility principle suggests that "mental construals are based on the information that is most accessible at the time applies to how we make sense of new information as well as to how we form judgments based on information retrieved from memory." Lastly, self-construal is how a person views the self in comparison to the others. This would suggest that self-construal influences a person's self-esteem. Construal itself is a broad concept in the realm of social psychology and can be applied to many different situations that will be discussed later in this article.

== Major empirical evidence ==
In 1946, Solomon Asch directed one of the earliest known empirical studies of human construal. In this study, Asch focused on the formation of character impressions by asking each participant to study a list of personality traits and make judgments and/or inferences about the possessor of each of these listed traits. The results of this study demonstrated two different types of phenomena: the primacy effect and the disproportionate effect of certain types of words. For the primacy effect, those personality traits that were listed earlier in the list seemed to have much more influence on the subject's impression of the person with that trait. However, Asch's finding that there was a variability in the effect of categorical terms such as "warmth" and "coldness" hint that those listed traits were "susceptible to variable interpretation or construal—and the specific meaning attached depended upon the more global impressions adopted by the subjects".

In a study headed by Lee D. Ross, David Green, and Pamela House (1976), eighty Stanford University undergraduates were asked if they were willing to walk around campus for at least thirty minutes while wearing a large sandwich board sign that read "Eat at Joe's" and record the responses of their peers to this novel situation. The subjects were not only asked to answer whether or not they would participate, but they were also asked to estimate other people's responses, and make inferences about the disposition of each group of people based on their agreement and disagreement to participate. Overall, the experimenters found that "those who agreed to participate thought that an average of 62% of their peers would agree"; but, those who disagreed with participating thought that an average 33% of their peers would agree to the job". Furthermore, those who agreed had more extreme inferences about the personal dispositions of those who disagreed, and vice versa. The results indicated that the subjects failed to recognize that their peer's construal or interpretation of the situation may be quite different from the perspective they personally take. (see also false consensus effect)

In 2004, Lee D. Ross developed a theory of a type of construal that he calls "naïve realism." In a simple experiment, Ross took peace proposals created by Israeli negotiators, labeled them as Palestinian proposals, and told Israeli citizens that the ideas in the proposal were the ideas that Palestinians wanted the Israeli to adopt. Then, he took the original proposals and told the Israeli subjects that ideas on the proposal were the ideas that the Israelis wanted the Palestinians to adopt. The Israeli citizens liked the proposals from the Israelis to the Palestinians more than the proposal from the Palestinians to the Israelis, even though they were the same proposal. Ross stated:

Even when each side recognizes that the other side perceives the issues differently, each thinks that the other side is biased while they themselves are objective and that their own perceptions of reality should provide the basis for settlement."

== Self ==
Hazel Rose Markus and Shinobu Kitayama argue that differences between independent and interdependent self-concepts lead to different consequences for a number of cognitive and motivational processes. They argue that the distinctions made regarding independent and interdependent construals should be viewed as general tendencies that may emerge when the members of the culture are considered as a whole. Also, "According to Markus and Kitayama (1991), those with an independent self-construal define themselves in terms of internal attributes such as traits, abilities, values, and preferences. In contrast, those with an interdependent self-construal define themselves in terms of their relationships with others." Many who argue these separate views of construal say that both views can strongly affect a person's experience.

The following is a research study about the way in which a person's construal can affect his/her mental health status. Michael S. Christopher and Gemma D. Skillman conducted a study to test the link between self-construal and distress among African American and Asian American college students. Their research is primarily based on previous assertions that ethnic minorities are more likely to experience distress and express apprehension about the rigors of college. One body of literature has commonly viewed three major minority groups-African Americans, Asian Americans, and Latino Americans- as more likely to display traits of interdependent self-construal. It suggests that on the other hand White Americans were more likely to show traits of individualism or independent self-construal. Current research, however, has begun to move away from this view, and indicates African American students also show a more independent view of self. Therefore, to try and contrast these two views the researchers chose to study African Americans and Asian Americans. In their study they found "African American students reported greater independent construals than did Asian American students, whereas Asian American students reported greater interdependent self-construals than did African American students." In regard to whether self-construal contributed to reports of distress they found that viewing self-construal as independent or interdependent did not predict distress. A person reported to have a more interdependent view of self was more likely to experience distress symptoms. This type of research finding can have major effects on future counseling practices. These researchers encourage counselors to measure self-construals upon intake to help guide treatment.

Markus and Kitayama's self-construal theory postulates that there are two basic ways of conceptualizing the human person and that cultures differ according to which of those they subscribe to. Egoism, individual pride, individual uniqueness, independent thinking, self-expression, self-reliance and self-enhancement are believed to be facets of one and the same coherent entity named the independent self-construal. On the other hand, altruism, modesty, belief in one's similarity with others, conformity to group norms, self-censorship for the sake of group harmony and cooperation are believed to be facets of the interdependent self-construal. However, the idea that there exists cultures that promote an independent or interdependent form of self construal has been severely criticized Vignoles et al.’s comparative study of 55 cultural groups shows that there are no such kind of culturally normative independent or interdependent self-contruals as predicted by Markus and Kitayama’s theory. At the cultural level of analysis, believing in and valuing uniqueness is postulated by this theory to be positively correlated with egoism, while in reality they are negatively correlated. Experiencing the self as emotionally detached and independent from social contexts was supposed to be positively related to self-reliance, while in reality the two concepts are negatively related. Independent thinking was supposed to be correlated positively with self-reliance, but in reality they are negatively correlated. The same is true for independent thinking and self-consistency across contexts as well as self-reliance and self-expression. Moreover, Japanese culture was found to promote individual uniqueness and independent thinking more than other human cultures in the sample, which directly contradicts Markus and Kitayama.

=== In the classroom ===
Rebecca wing-yi Cheng and Shui-fong Lam measured the effects of self-construal in the classroom. They studied the "role of self-construal as a moderator of the social comparison effects in authentic classrooms." With the use of 96 Chinese seventh grade students they compared independent and interdependent views of self-construal to upward social comparison and downward social comparison. They noted that "self comparison is commonly used when people are uncertain of their self-evaluation. It allows an individual to gain information about where they stand." The students participated in an Abstract Reasoning Test and reading comprehension task. They manipulated construal by telling the students they were either being compared to others within their school (independent self-construal) or between their school and another school (interdependent self-construal). The results showed that the school children who performed very well experienced negative self-evaluation while those who did not experienced negative self-evaluation. However, those in the interdependent self construal condition always reported positive self-evaluation showcasing a term known as basking-in-reflected-glory. The hope of this study is to encourage classrooms to ensure that interdependent self-construal is being emphasized.

=== In social marketing ===
Research drawing on self-construals now shows ways to reduce the intentions of people to binge drink or engage in dangerous driving. An article by Martin, Lee, Weeks and Kaya (2013) suggests that understanding consumer personality and how people view others is important. People were shown ads talking of the harmful effects of binge drinking. People who valued close friends as a sense of who they are, were less likely to want to binge drink after seeing an ad featuring them and a close friend. People who were loners or who did not see close friends important to their sense of who they were reacted better to ads featuring a person. A similar pattern was shown for ads showing a person driving at dangerous speeds. This suggests ads showing potential harm to citizens from binge drinking or dangerous driving are less effective than ads highlighting a person's close friends.

== Mammography ==
Some researches have believed that construal can have major implications on self-perception of health status. As cited by a Times article "women ages 20–49 should have a physical examination by a health professional every one or two years." Specifically, in relation to breast cancer, women should do monthly self-examinations. However, after about age 40 women should begin mammograms, an effective low-radiation screening method for breast cancer. Although the age and frequency of which women should begin breast exams are highly debated the general consensus is that those over age 50 should be examined annually. Unfortunately, the number of women engaging in regular screenings is still not as high as it could be. Consequently, one study of construal conducted by Gallagher and colleagues looked at the link between message framing and perceptions about breast cancer susceptibility. The research is primarily based on the assumption that "people's responses to framed messages may not always be a simple reflection of the presumed risky nature of screening behaviors, but rather shaped by beliefs about risk." Therefore, in this particular study they "assessed women's illness-detecting v. health-affirming construal of mammography." They found "that among women who have a family history of breast cancer, their construal of mammography moderates their responses to framed messages. Such that, loss-framed messages are more effective in promoting screening for those with illness-detecting construals, but gain-framed messages are more effective for those with health-affirming construals." Their research shows that the perception of susceptibility to the development of breast cancer was not directly associated with a person's construal of the function of mammography.

== Market research ==
Researchers are trying to establish links between construal, self and economics. In 2007, Liberman and colleagues discussed the links between construal level theory and consumer choice, better decision making, the nature of regret and choice set management.

== See also ==
- Heuristics in judgment and decision-making
- Meaning-making
- Phenomenology (psychology)
- Philosophy of perception
