= Mark Lepper =

American psychologist

- Education: Stanford University; Yale University
- Known for: attitude polarization false consensus effect false polarization effect hostile media effect belief perseverance overjustification
- Scientific career
- Fields: Psychology
- Workplaces: Stanford University
- Thesis: Dissonance, self perception, and the generalization of moral behavior (1971)
- Doctoral advisor: Edward Zigler
- Doctoral students: Thomas Gilovich Sheena Iyengar

Mark R. Lepper (born December 5, 1944) is the Albert Ray Lang Professor of psychology (emeritus) at Stanford University, and a leading theorist in social psychology. He is particularly known for his research on attribution theory and confirmation bias, and for his collaborations with Lee Ross.

== Life ==
Lepper is primarily responsible for the elucidation of the overjustification effect, alongside Richard Nisbett.

With frequent collaborator Lee Ross, and Robert Vallone, he authored the first study to identify the hostile media effect. With Ross and Charles Lord he also authored an important study on attitude change and what is now called disconfirmation bias. With Lord he later theorized attitude representation theory. He has also worked with Thomas Gilovich and Merrill Carlsmith.

Lepper attended Stanford University as an undergraduate, earning a B.A. with great distinction in psychology in 1966. He subsequently earned a Ph.D. in Social and Developmental Psychology at Yale University in 1970, returning to Stanford in 1971 as an assistant professor. Lepper became a full professor of psychology and, by courtesy, of education in 1982, and has since served as chairman of the department of psychology between 1990 and 1994, and again after 2000. He is a fellow of the American Psychological Association and a charter fellow of the American Psychological Society. He was elected to the American Academy of Arts and Sciences in 2004.
