= Social projection =

Expecting others to act similarly to oneself

In social psychology, social projection is the psychological process through which an individual expects behaviors or attitudes of others to be similar to their own. Social projection occurs between individuals as well as across ingroup and outgroup contexts in a variety of domains. Research has shown that aspects of social categorization affect the extent to which social projection occurs. Cognitive and motivational approaches have been used to understand the psychological underpinnings of social projection as a phenomenon. Cognitive approaches emphasize social projection as a heuristic, while motivational approaches contextualize social projection as a means to feel connected to others. In contemporary research on social projection, researchers work to further distinguish between the effects of social projection and self-stereotyping on the individual’s perception of others.

== History ==
The term social projection was first coined by Floyd Allport in 1924. The idea refers to the process of creating knowledge about the characteristics of an individual or group of individuals based on the self as a reference point. Building off Leon Festinger’s theory of social comparisons, researchers became interested in how attitudes about groups or individuals were created in the absence of information about the comparison group. Modern investigation of social projection diverges from Festinger’s conception of social comparison theory by emphasizing that the consensus creation process is an implicit rather than explicit phenomenon. Further, the process can and does occur without clear information about the true consensus of the individual or reference group. The classic study by Ross, Greene, and House(1977) on the false consensus effect sparked further interest in how social projection processes lead individuals to believe that their own behaviors and beliefs are common among other individuals. Research has since shown that this phenomenon has links to the projection of attitudes, behaviors, and beliefs onto others in a wide variety of social contexts. Current lines of research are concerned with three main facets of social projection: the extent to which the projection process is automatic, differentiating the effect of social projection from self-stereotyping, and moderators of the social projection process.

== Experimental evidence ==
At a general level, social projection appears to be robust, as research shows individuals continue to rely on social projection when evaluating others even when they have been made explicitly aware of the phenomenon. Social projection research has also demonstrated that this phenomenon has consistent effects across different social contexts. Early research found that as a prerequisite for social projection to occur, individuals must perceive the other or group as similar to themselves in some capacity. In addition to similarity, the effect of social projection is also determined by an evaluation of valence. Research shows that individuals are more likely to project their own thoughts or beliefs onto others when their perception of the other person or group is more positive. Despite the consistency of these effects across domains of emotion and behavior, differences in the strength of this phenomenon have been shown to depend on whether projections are targeted towards a common ingroup or an outgroup.

=== Effect ===
Research has shown that when no information is available for an individual to create a social comparison, individuals tend to believe that others will generally agree with their positions. This concept holds true for several other attitudinal measures. For example, in relationships people tend to project their own attitudes onto their partner. Those who feel positively about themselves also tend to feel more positively about their partners, while those who feel negatively about themselves report less positive evaluations. Social projection is also relevant when predicting the emotions of others. Research investigating the influence of social projection on stock market behavior found that those who were fearful of a crash felt that others were also fearful and were more likely to pull out of the market. Research in political psychology has demonstrated that social projection also occurs in the political process. An American study found that those with more polarized opinions on political issues perceive others to be more polarized as well.

=== Behavior ===
Studies have also shown that social projection often informs the way that individuals create information around the behavior and intentions of others in a variety of contexts. Research has shown that after receiving self relevant feedback, individuals tended to either overestimate or underestimate the performance of others depending on how they personally performed, such that successful individuals estimated that others would also be successful and unsuccessful individuals estimated that others would be unsuccessful as well. The over or under estimation in this context was dependent on receiving feedback, but in general situations where feedback was not provided, individuals tended to have more optimistic perceptions of other people’s behavior in general, believing that people were more likely to succeed on average. A similar effect was found in studies assessing social projection and the perception of cooperative behavior. Using a prisoner's dilemma task, research has shown that those who decide to cooperate tend to believe that others will cooperate as well. The same finding has been replicated in evaluations of goal oriented behavior in both learning oriented and competitive situations. Regardless of whether an individual's personal goals are held implicitly or have been explicitly assigned, individuals tended to project their own goals onto others. Psychologists argue that this tendency for individuals to believe others will act in similar ways as themselves has functional impacts on improving group cohesion and cooperative behavior.

=== Ingroup projection ===
While social projection may occur and both individual and group level comparisons, a meta-analysis revealed that the effects of ingroup projection are much stronger than outgroup projection. In line with general social projection, ingroup projection research has shown that individuals have a tendency to project features of their own ingroup onto another superordinate group category. For example, Germans may project what they perceive to be German qualities onto the superordinate group category of Europeans. Michael Wenzel and Amélie Mummendey created the ingroup projection model to describe the specific process of group-based social projection which states that individuals compare their ingroup to other similar groups using the frame of a common superordinate group identity. As a process, ingroup projection is thought to have important implications for core intergroup relations processes like ingroup favoritism and ingroup differentiation. Studies of ingroup projection also show that the projection process is sensitive to beliefs about the ingroup. In situations where the ingroup is perceived as positive, ingroup projection has a stronger effect. However when the group is viewed negatively, individual level social projection becomes the dominant effect in ascribing traits to others.

=== Outgroup projection ===
Contrary to common sense assumptions that an individual’s outgroup projections would lead to negative or opposite evaluations of an outgroup, one meta-analysis indicates that there seems to be little support for negative projection to outgroups. In this meta-analysis, researchers found a small effect of social projection where individuals projected their own characteristics to a smaller extent on outgroup members as well. Researchers believe the existence of social projection to outgroup members is a function of perceived similarity, such that if the outgroup target is perceived as similar to the individual, social projection processes will occur. Another possible explanation for smaller observed levels of outgroup projection is that the implicit process of projecting may be mitigated or suppressed when the individual realizes they are dissimilar from the outgroup. One study that addresses this similarity claim by asking individuals to imagine having a conversation with a member of the outgroup. Results suggest that imagined contact is able to facilitate social projection processes in outgroup contexts. Experiments have confirmed the presence of counter-projections to out-groups, however.

== Effect of social categorization ==
Research has shown that aspects of social categorization have an effect on the extent to which individuals rely on social projection. An example of the influence of social categorization is the impact of the individual's own group evaluation. One analysis found that the strength of social projection is dependent on group member status and actual consensus. In general, as actual consensus increased, majority group members tended to underestimate and minority group members tended to overestimate their beliefs as being shared by others. Additionally, group membership appears to moderate the effects of social projection and stereotyping, such that both projection and stereotyping only occur when an individual is a member of the group they are evaluating. Some researchers have utilized minimal group paradigms that directly compare the effects of different types of social categories and found that social projection is strongest in clearly defined ingroups, intermediate effects in groups with a mixture of relevant and non-relevant characteristics, and weak effects in clearly defined outgroups. The influence of social categorization appears to be a major determinant of the social projection process. Research has found that changes in an individual’s social categorization (the groups to which they belong) affects an individual’s use of social projection. One study found that when individuals are recategorized into new groups, they will only socially project onto the most recent group and do not project to previous ingroups.

== Cognitive versus motivational approach ==
The two main beliefs regarding the psychological underpinnings of social projection are based in cognitive and motivational approaches. Those who endorse the cognitive approach to understanding social projection believe that this phenomenon is an automatic cognitive heuristic that is built off of a holistic comparison of the self to the projection target. The motivational approach posits that social projection is a result of an individual’s needs to feel connected to others, and that social projection is a means through which these needs are met.

=== Cognitive perspectives ===
Cognitive approaches seek to investigate social projection as an underlying psychological heuristic in the evaluation of others. One cognitive approach using reaction times in self-other evaluations has shown that when the reference point is well defined(either the self or the ingroup), evaluating the self onto the ingroup (social projection) was significantly faster than evaluations of the ingroup to the self. Researchers suggest that this is evidence that social projection is a heuristic process that is readily utilized when group based information is ambiguous. Research utilizing implicit association tests have also been used as evidence of social projection as a heuristic process, as researchers claim the tendency for individuals to ascribe self relevant traits to targeted groups in an implicit paradigm suggests a level of automaticity in processing. Familiarity may also have a role in social projection. Researchers found that when an individual gained more personal experience with a behavior, they tended to project their experience more onto others, suggesting that projection is a result of highly salient self-relevant information. Further underscoring this point, priming studies show that reliance on social projection may be the result of salient information. Researchers suggest that primed information is more readily available to an individual and may therefore appear in the appraisal of others.

=== Motivational perspectives ===
Motivational approaches assert that projection happens as a result of a need to be seen in a positive light or to make connections with others. Researchers suggest that the presence of projection in minimal group paradigm studies (where groups hold no prior meaning to an individual) is evidence that projection is motivated by a need to positively differentiate one’s own group from others. In research on the effects of positive ingroup evaluations, social projection shown to predict higher levels of preference for fellow ingroup members. There is also evidence that social projection increases when mortality is made salient, suggesting that social projection is a means through which individuals make interpersonal connections with others. Others have found that the impact of valence on social projection processes points to the need for individuals to drive connection through positive attributions. Moreover, research on attachment styles has demonstrated that an individual’s attachment style determines the type of qualities they project onto others, leading researchers to believe that social connection in part informs social projection processes. Some researchers also argue that the context dependent nature of social projection provides evidence of projection as a motivated phenomenon. In a study on cooperation and social projection, researchers found that an individual’s projection of traits only occurred when the individual believed their traits were beneficial in performing the cooperation task.

== Social projection versus self-stereotyping ==
Meta-analyses of social projection have noted that the effects of social projection in laboratory experiments are higher than those seen in real world group scenarios. Many in turn, believe that self-stereotyping may contribute to the differential effects found between real world and minimal group projection effects. This has led to debate on how and when individuals rely on social projection or self-stereotyping to evaluate others in the absence of information about other individuals or groups. To address these problems, modern research has sought to understand when and how social projection and self-stereotyping contribute to the formation of beliefs about others using self-relevant information. In some cognitive approaches, researchers have pointed to shorter reaction times in self to group evaluations as evidence that social projection can be meaningfully distinguished as a more implicit process than self-stereotyping in explaining the process of self-other correspondence. Other researchers focus on the different contextual factors that lead to either social projection or self-stereotyping. One study found that perceived similarity directly affected the use of social projection as a means to gain information about another individual or group of individuals. Greater levels of perceived similarity result in more reliance on social projection and less reliance on stereotyping in making evaluations of other individuals or groups. Others have argued that social projection and self-stereotyping are processes that work in tandem when an individual evaluates similarities between the self and others. In other words, views about the self influence projections made to others and beliefs about others in the ingroup influence views about the self. Some researchers claim that reliance on social projection or self-stereotyping changes as a function of development. A study on attitudes towards deviant behavior found that through adolescence, individuals rely more heavily on self-stereotyping, but as individuals transition from adolescence to adulthood social projection becomes more prominent.

== See also ==
- False consensus effect
- Egocentric bias
- Heuristic
- In-group favoritism
