= Curse of knowledge =

Cognitive bias of assuming others share your knowledge

The curse of knowledge, also called the curse of expertise or expert's curse, is a cognitive bias that occurs when a person who has specialized knowledge assumes that others share in that knowledge.

For example, in a classroom setting, teachers may struggle if they cannot put themselves in the position of the student. A knowledgeable professor might no longer remember the difficulties that a student faces when learning a new subject. This curse of knowledge also explains the danger behind thinking about student learning based on what seems best to faculty members, as opposed to what has been verified with students.

== History of concept ==
The term "curse of knowledge" was coined in a 1989 Journal of Political Economy article by economists Colin Camerer, George Loewenstein, and Martin Weber. The aim of their research was to counter the "conventional assumptions in such (economic) analyses of asymmetric information in that better-informed agents can accurately anticipate the judgement of less-informed agents".

Such research drew from Baruch Fischhoff's work in 1975 surrounding hindsight bias, a cognitive bias that knowing the outcome of a certain event makes it seem more predictable. Research conducted by Fischhoff revealed that participants did not know that their outcome knowledge affected their responses, and, if they did know, they could still not ignore or defeat the effects of the bias. Study participants could not accurately reconstruct their previous, less knowledgeable states of mind, which directly relates to the curse of knowledge. This poor reconstruction was theorized by Fischhoff to be because the participant was "anchored in the hindsightful state of mind created by receipt of knowledge". This receipt of knowledge returns to the idea of the curse proposed by Camerer, Loewenstein, and Weber: a knowledgeable person cannot accurately reconstruct what a person, be it themselves or someone else, without the knowledge would think, or how they would act. In his paper, Fischhoff questions the failure to empathize with ourselves in less knowledgeable states, and notes that how well people manage to reconstruct perceptions of lesser informed others is a crucial question for historians and "all human understanding".

This research led the economists Camerer, Loewenstein, and Weber to focus on the economic implications of the concept and question whether the curse harms the allocation of resources in an economic setting. The idea that better-informed parties may suffer losses in a deal or exchange was seen as something important to bring to the sphere of economic theory. Most theoretical analyses of situations where one party knew less than the other focused on how the lesser-informed party attempted to learn more information to minimize information asymmetry. However, in these analyses, there is an assumption that better-informed parties can optimally exploit their information asymmetry when they, in fact, cannot. People cannot utilize their additional, better information, even when they should in a bargaining situation.

For example, two people are bargaining over dividing money or provisions. One party may know the size of the amount being divided while the other does not. However, to fully exploit their advantage, the informed party should make the same offer regardless of the amount of material to be divided. But informed parties actually offer more when the amount to be divided is larger. Informed parties are unable to ignore their better information, even when they should.

== Experimental evidence ==
A 1990 experiment by a Stanford University graduate student, Elizabeth Newton, illustrated the curse of knowledge in the results of a simple task. A group of subjects were asked to "tap" out well known songs with their fingers, while another group tried to name the melodies. When the "tappers" were asked to predict how many of the "tapped" songs would be recognized by listeners, they would always overestimate. The curse of knowledge is demonstrated here as the "tappers" are so familiar with what they were tapping that they assumed listeners would easily recognize the tune.

Susan Birch and Paul Bloom similarly found a curse of knowledge in a study involving Yale University students. Participants were told that a person named Denise moved her sister Vicki's violin without Vicki knowing. When participants are told where Denise placed the violin, they are more likely to think Vicki will first look for the violin in that new location. The curse of knowledge was less pronounced when Denise put the violin in a less plausible place. However, a replication study conducted in 2014 found that this finding was not reliably reproducible across seven experiments with large sample sizes, and the true effect size of this phenomenon was less than half of that reported in the original findings. Therefore, it is suggested that "the influence of plausibility on the curse of knowledge in adults appears to be small enough that its impact on real-life perspective-taking may need to be reevaluated."

The curse of knowledge has been found in other domains too. For instance, in data visualisation, when participants are told a background story with a certain graph, they notice the part of the graph that corresponds with this story. They then believe others, who have not heard this background story, will notice the same pattern.

Two potential reasons are given for the bias. One is that people who know the answer find it difficult to disregard (inhibit) that information when considering other people's knowledge. The second potential reason is that people are more familiar with the general topic area. In one experiment, students exposed to questions on an earlier date, but not the answers, still estimate more people would know the answers than students who had not seen the answers before.

Related to this finding is the phenomenon experienced by players of charades: the actor may find it frustratingly hard to believe that their teammates keep failing to guess the secret phrase, known only to the actor, conveyed by pantomime.

== Correcting the bias ==
The curse of knowledge is a difficult bias to correct. For instance, the cognitive bias does not reduce when you tell people about it or ask them to think more about the other's perspective. Financial incentives were equally ineffective in reducing the bias.

== Implications ==
In the Camerer, Loewenstein, and Weber article, it is mentioned that the setting closest in structure to the market experiments done would be underwriting, a task in which well-informed experts price goods that are sold to a less-informed public.

Investment bankers value securities, experts taste cheese, store buyers observe jewelry being modeled, and theater owners see movies before they are released. They then sell those goods to a less-informed public. If they suffer from the curse of knowledge, high-quality goods will be overpriced and low-quality goods underpriced relative to optimal, profit-maximizing prices; prices will reflect characteristics (e.g., quality) that are unobservable to uninformed buyers.

The curse of knowledge has a paradoxical effect in these settings. By making better-informed agents think that their knowledge is shared by others, the curse helps alleviate the inefficiencies that result from information asymmetries (a better informed party having an advantage in a bargaining situation), bringing outcomes closer to complete information. In such settings, the curse on individuals may actually improve social welfare ("you get what you pay for").

=== Marketing ===
Economists Camerer, Loewenstein, and Weber first applied the curse of knowledge phenomenon to economics, in order to explain why and how the assumption that better-informed agents can accurately anticipate the judgments of lesser-informed agents is not inherently true. They also sought to support the finding that sales agents who are better informed about their products may, in fact, be at a disadvantage against other, less-informed agents when selling their products. The reason is said to be that better-informed agents fail to ignore the privileged knowledge that they possess and are thus "cursed" and unable to sell their products at a value that more naïve agents would deem acceptable.

=== Education ===
The curse of knowledge could contribute to the difficulty of teaching. The curse of knowledge means that it could be potentially ineffective, if not harmful, to think about how students are viewing and learning material by asking the perspective of the teacher as opposed to what has been verified by students. The teacher already has the knowledge that they are trying to impart, but the way that knowledge is conveyed may not be the best for those who do not already possess the knowledge.

The curse of expertise may be counterproductive for learners acquiring new skills. This is important because the predictions of experts can influence educational equity and training as well as the personal development of young people, not to mention the allocation of time and resources to scientific research and crucial design decisions. Effective teachers must predict the issues and misconceptions that people will face when learning a complex new skill or understanding an unfamiliar concept. This should also encompass the teachers' recognizing their own or each other's bias blind spots.

Decoding the Disciplines is another way of coping with the curse of knowledge in educational settings. It intends to increase student learning by narrowing the gap between expert and novice thinking resulting from the curse of knowledge. The process seeks to make explicit the tacit knowledge of experts and to help students master the mental actions they need for success in particular disciplines.

== Related biases ==
Two related biases are the false consensus bias and the hindsight bias.

People typically overestimate how many people hold the same opinions as them. This is called the false consensus effect. This is especially true for strongly held opinion. In software design, the mantra "You are not the user" reflects attempts to counter this bias, as software developers may think their experience of a user interface is representative of the final user.

The hindsight bias is the tendency of people to overestimate how well they could have predicted the future, given knowledge of what has happened. It can be seen as a 'special case' of the curse of knowledge, now applied to a past self, rather than to others. What makes it difficult to estimate other people's knowledge may also make it difficult to assess your own prior knowledge.

== Popular culture ==
The difficulty experienced people may encounter is exemplified fictionally by Dr. Watson in discourses with the insightful detective Sherlock Holmes.

== See also ==
- Adverse selection – Selective trading based on possession of hidden information
- Dunning–Kruger effect – Cognitive bias about one's own skill
- Einstellung effect – Development of a mechanized state of mind
- Empathy gap (social psychology) – Breakdown in empathy
- Naive realism – Human tendency to believe that we see the world around us objectively
- Shoshin – Zen Buddhism concept of the beginner's mind
- Who's on First? – Comedy routine made famous by Abbott and Costello
- Winner's curse – Tendency to overestimate in auctions
- Zone of proximal development – Concept in educational psychology
