= Reactive devaluation =

Cognitive bias

Reactive devaluation is a cognitive bias that occurs when a proposal is devalued if it appears to originate from an antagonist. The bias was proposed by Lee Ross and Constance Stillinger (1988).

Reactive devaluation could be caused by loss aversion or attitude polarization, or naïve realism.

== Studies ==
In an initial experiment, Stillinger and co-authors asked pedestrians in the US whether they would support a drastic bilateral nuclear arms reduction program. If they were told the proposal came from President Ronald Reagan, 90 percent said it would be favorable or even-handed to the United States; if they were told the proposal came from a group of unspecified policy analysts, 80 percent thought it was favorable or even; but, if respondents were told it came from Mikhail Gorbachev only 44 percent thought it was favorable or neutral to the United States.

In another experiment, a contemporaneous controversy at Stanford University led to the university divesting of South African assets because of the apartheid regime. Students at Stanford were asked to evaluate the University's divestment plan before it was announced publicly and after such. Proposals including the actual eventual proposal were valued more highly when they were hypothetical.

In another study, experimenters showed Israeli participants a peace proposal which had been actually proposed by Israel. If participants were told the proposal came from a Palestinian source, they rated it lower than if they were told (correctly) the identical proposal came from the Israeli government. If participants identified as "hawkish" were told it came from a "dovish" Israeli government, they believed it was relatively bad for their people and good for the other side, but not if participants identified as "doves".

== See also ==
- Genetic fallacy
- Bulverism
- In-group favoritism
- The Boy Who Cried Wolf
- Shooting the messenger
