= Dispositionist =

Term used in social psychology

"Dispositionist" is a term in social psychology used to describe those that believe people's actions are conditioned by some internal factor, such as beliefs, values, personality traits or abilities, rather than the situation they find themselves in.

A disposionist is a person who believes in lay dispositionism, the tendency to use personality traits or other dispositions (e.g., intelligence) to explain and predict social actions or outcomes.

For example, a dispositionist might explain bankruptcy as the largely self-inflicted result of personal laziness and/or imprudence. Situationists, in contrast, view bankruptcy as frequently caused by more complicated external forces, such as divorce or the medical and other costs of unanticipated illness.

Lay dispositionism has been evaluated in relationship to implicit theories of personality.

The opposite of dispositionism is "situationism".

== Dispositionism, regulatory capture and deep capture ==
Dispositionism as a concept has also been used in political science (regulatory capture), law and economics (regulatory economics).

First a quick example illustrating fundamental attribution error often called actor–observer bias. If Alice saw Bob trip over a rock and fall, Alice might consider Bob to be clumsy or careless (dispositional). If Alice tripped over the same rock herself, she would be more likely to blame the placement of the rock (situational). This different perspective on essentially same thing is what allows regulatory capture and deep capture, discussed below.

The idea of regulatory capture has an obvious economic basis, in that vested interests in an industry have the greatest financial stake in regulatory activity and are more likely to be motivated to influence the regulatory body than dispersed individual consumers, each of whom have little particular incentive to try to influence regulators. When regulators form expert bodies to examine policy, this invariably features current or former industry members, or at the very least, individuals with contacts in the industry.

Some economists, such as Jon Hanson and his co-authors, argue that the phenomenon extends beyond just political agencies and organizations. Businesses have an incentive to control anything that has power over them, including institutions from the media, academia and popular culture, thus they will try to capture them as well. This phenomenon is called deep capture.

== See also ==
- Fundamental attribution error
