= Hindsight bias =

Type of confirmation bias

Hindsight bias, also known as the knew-it-all-along phenomenon or creeping determinism, is the common tendency for people to perceive past events as having been more predictable than they were.

After an event has occurred, people often believe that they could have predicted or perhaps even known with a high degree of certainty what the outcome of the event would be before it occurred. Hindsight bias may cause distortions of memories of what was known or believed before an event occurred and is a significant source of overconfidence in one's ability to predict the outcomes of future events. Examples of hindsight bias can be seen in the writings of historians describing the outcomes of battles, in physicians' recall of clinical trials, and in criminal or civil trials as people tend to assign responsibility on the basis of the supposed predictability of accidents.

== History ==
The hindsight bias, although it was not yet named, was not a new concept when it emerged in psychological research in the 1970s. In fact, it had been indirectly described numerous times by historians, philosophers, and physicians. In 1973, Baruch Fischhoff attended a seminar where Paul E. Meehl stated an observation: clinicians often overestimate their ability to have foreseen the outcome of a particular case, claiming they knew it all along. Baruch, a psychology graduate student at the time, saw an opportunity in psychological research to explain this tendency.

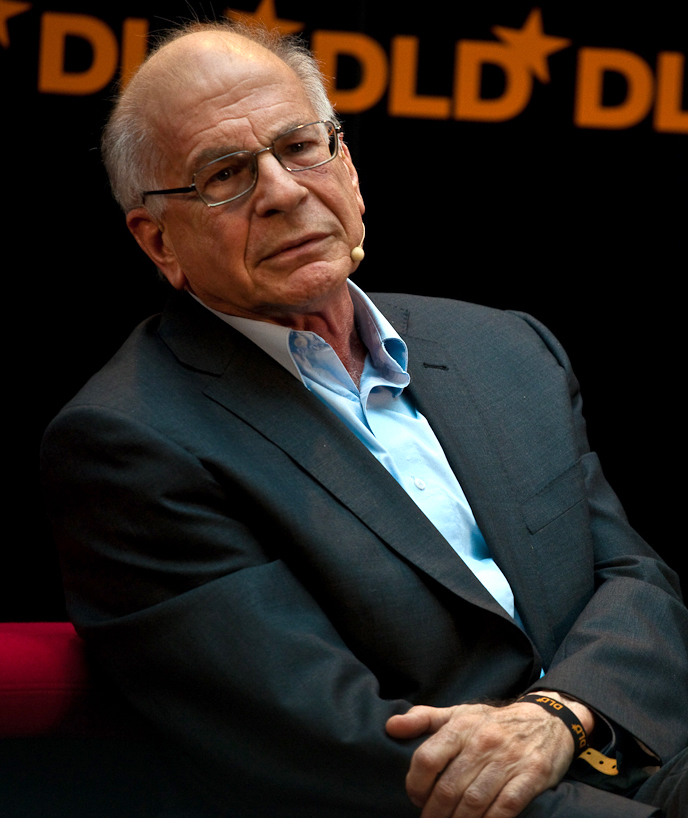
Daniel Kahneman, who researched hindsight bias

In the early 70s, the investigation of heuristics and biases was a large area of study in psychology, led by Amos Tversky and Daniel Kahneman. Two heuristics identified by Tversky and Kahneman were of immediate importance in the development of the hindsight bias; these were the availability heuristic and the representativeness heuristic.

In an elaboration of these heuristics, Beyth and Fischhoff devised the first experiment directly testing the hindsight bias. They asked participants to judge the likelihood of several outcomes of US president Richard Nixon's upcoming visit to Beijing and Moscow. Some time after president Nixon's return, participants were asked to recall (or reconstruct) the probabilities they had assigned to each possible outcome, and their perceptions of the likelihood of each outcome were greater or overestimated for events that had occurred. This study is frequently referred to in definitions of the hindsight bias, and the title of the paper, "I knew it would happen," may have contributed to the hindsight bias being interchangeable with the phrase, "knew-it-all-along phenomenon".

In 1975, Fischhoff developed another method for investigating the hindsight bias, which was, at the time, referred to as the "creeping determinism hypothesis". This method involves giving participants a short story with four possible outcomes, one of which they are told is true, and are then asked to assign the likelihood of each particular outcome. Participants frequently assign a higher likelihood of occurrence to whichever outcome they have been told is true. Remaining relatively unmodified, this method is still used in psychological and behavioural experiments investigating aspects of the hindsight bias. Having evolved from the heuristics of Tversky and Kahneman into the creeping determinism hypothesis and finally into the hindsight bias as we now know it, the concept has many practical applications and is still at the forefront of research today. Recent studies involving the hindsight bias have investigated the effect age has on the bias, how hindsight may impact interference and confusion, and how it may affect banking and investment strategies.

== Factors ==
=== Outcome valence and intensity ===
Hindsight bias is more likely to occur when the outcome of an event is negative rather than positive. This is a phenomenon consistent with the general tendency for people to pay more attention to negative outcomes of events than positive outcomes.

In addition, hindsight bias is affected by the severity of the negative outcome. In malpractice lawsuits, it has been found that the more severe a negative outcome is, the juror's hindsight bias is more dramatic. In a perfectly objective case, the verdict would be based on the physician's standard of care instead of the outcome of the treatment; however, studies show that cases ending in severe negative outcomes (such as death) result in a higher level of hindsight bias.

For example, in 1996, LaBine proposed a scenario where a psychiatric patient told a therapist that he was contemplating harming another individual. The therapist did not warn the other individual of the possible danger. Participants were each given one of three possible outcomes; the threatened individual either received no injuries, minor injuries, or serious injuries. Participants were then asked to determine if the physician should be considered negligent. Participants in the "serious injuries" condition were not only more likely to rate the therapist as negligent but also rated the attack as more foreseeable. Participants in the no injuries and minor injury categories were more likely to see the therapist's actions as reasonable.

=== Surprise ===
The role of surprise can help explain the malleability of hindsight bias. Surprise influences how the mind reconstructs pre-outcome predictions in three ways: 1. Surprise is a direct metacognitive heuristic to estimate the distance between outcome and prediction. 2. Surprise triggers a deliberate sense-making process. 3. Surprise biases this process (the malleability of hindsight bias) by enhancing the recall of surprise-congruent information and expectancy-based hypothesis testing.

Pezzo's sense-making model supports two contradicting ideas of a surprising outcome. The results can show a lesser hindsight bias or possibly a reversed effect, where the individual believes the outcome was not a possibility at all. The outcome can also lead to the hindsight bias being magnified to have a stronger effect. The sense-making process is triggered by an initial surprise. If the sense-making process is not complete and the sensory information is not detected or coded [by the individual], the sensation is experienced as a surprise and the hindsight bias has a gradual reduction. When the sense-making process is lacking, the phenomena of reversed hindsight bias is created. Without the sense-making process being present, there is no remnant of thought about the surprise. This can lead to a sensation of not believing the outcome as a possibility.

=== Personality ===
Along with the emotion of surprise, the personality traits of an individual affect hindsight bias. A new C model is an approach to figure out the bias and accuracy in human inferences because of their individual personality traits. This model integrates accurate personality judgments and hindsight effects as a by-product of knowledge updating.

During the study, three processes showed potential to explain the occurrence of hindsight effects in personality judgments: 1. Changes in an individual's cue perceptions, 2. Changes in the use of more valid cues, and 3. Changes in the consistency with which an individual applies cue knowledge.

Following two studies, it was clear that there were hindsight effects for each of the Big Five personality dimensions. Evidence was found that both the utilization of more valid cues and changes in cue perceptions of the individual, but not changes in the consistency with which cue knowledge is applied, account for the hindsight effects. During both of these studies, participants were presented with target pictures and were asked to judge each target's levels of the Big Five personality traits.

In a study of 75 participants, researchers tested 10 personalities about hindsight bias. This study conducted three comparisons of hindsight estimation with foresight estimation (memory conditioning), hindsight estimation with forward estimation with other participants, and hindsight estimation with foresight estimation. The participants in these comparisons all demonstrated hindsight bias. Personality measures cannot account for memory hindsight in multiple regression analysis. Hindsight in individual differences is present but must be accounted for in the full effect model.

=== Age ===
It is more difficult to test for hindsight bias in children than adults because the verbal methods used in experiments on adults are too complex for children to understand, let alone measure bias. Some experimental procedures have been created with visual identification to test children about their hindsight bias in a way they can grasp. Methods with visual images start by presenting a blurry image to the child that becomes clearer over time. In some conditions, the subjects know what the final object is and in others they do not. In cases where the subject knows what the object shape will become when the image is clear, they are asked to estimate the amount of time other participants of similar age will take to guess what the object is. Due to hindsight bias, the estimated times are often much lower than the actual times. This is because the participant is using their personal knowledge while making their estimate.

These types of studies show that children are also affected by hindsight bias. Adults and children with hindsight bias share the core cognitive constraint of being biased to one's current knowledge while, at the same time, attempting to recall or reason about a more naïve cognitive state—regardless of whether the more naïve state is one's earlier naïve state or someone else's.

=== Auditory hindsight bias ===
Hindsight bias also affects human communications. To test auditory hindsight bias, four experiments were completed. Experiment one included plain words, in which low-pass filters were used to reduce the amplitude for sounds of consonants; thus making the words more degraded. In the naïve-identification task, participants were presented a warning tone before hearing the degraded words. In the hindsight estimation task, a warning tone was presented before the clear word followed by the degraded version of the word. Experiment two included words with explicit warnings of hindsight bias. It followed the same procedure as experiment one. However, the participants were informed and asked not to complete the same error. Experiment three included full sentences of degraded words rather than individual words. Experiment four included less-degraded words in order to make the words easier to understand and identify to the participants.

By using these different techniques, this offered a different range of detection and also evaluated the ecological validity of the experiment's effect. In each experiment, the hindsight estimates of the percentage that their naïve peers can correctly identify the words, all exceed the actual percentages. Therefore, knowing the identities of words caused people to overestimate others' naïve ability to identify moderately to highly degraded spoken versions of those words. People who know the outcome of an event tend to overestimate their prior knowledge or others' naïve knowledge of the event. As a result, speakers—knowing what is being communicated—tend to overestimate the clarity of their message while listeners—hearing what they want to hear—tend to overestimate their understanding of ambiguous messages. This miscommunication stems from hindsight bias which then creates a feeling of inevitability. Overall, this auditory hindsight bias occurs despite people's effort to avoid it.

=== Cognitive models ===
To understand how a person can so easily change the foundation of knowledge and belief for events after receiving new information, three cognitive models of hindsight bias have been reviewed. The three models are:

- SARA (Selective Activation and Reconstructive Anchoring),
- RAFT (reconstruction after feedback with take the best), and
- CMT (causal model theory).

SARA and RAFT focus on distortions or changes in a memory process, while CMT focuses on probability judgments of hindsight bias.

The SARA model, created by Rüdiger Pohl and associates, explains hindsight bias for descriptive information in memory and hypothetical situations. Memory design is when the participants make foresight judgements, and then recall them in hindsight. Hypothetical design is when participants make hindsight judgements as if they had not known the outcome. SARA assumes that people have a set of images to draw their memories from. They suffer from the hindsight bias due to selective activation or biased sampling of that set of images.

Basically, people only remember small, select amounts of information—and when asked to recall it later, use that biased image to support their opinions about the situation. The set of images is originally processed in the brain when first experienced. When remembered, this image reactivates, and the mind can edit and alter the memory, which takes place in hindsight bias when new and correct information is presented, leading one to believe that this new information, when remembered at a later time, is the person's original memory. Due to this reactivation in the brain, there may be permanent changes to the existing memory trace. The new information acts as a memory anchor causing retrieval impairment.

The RAFT model explains hindsight bias with comparisons of objects. It uses knowledge-based probability and then applies interpretations to those probabilities. When given two choices, a person recalls the information on both topics and makes assumptions based on how reasonable they find the information. An example case is someone comparing the size of two cities. If they know one city well (e.g. because it has a popular sporting team or through personal history) and know much less about the other, their mental cues for the more popular city increase. They then "take the best" option in their assessment of their probabilities. For example, they recognize a city due to knowing its sports team, and thus they assume that that city has the highest population. "Take the best" refers to a cue that is viewed as most valid and becomes support for the person's interpretations. RAFT is a by-product of adaptive learning. Feedback information updates a person's knowledge base. This can lead a person to be unable to retrieve the initial information because the information cue has been replaced by a cue that they thought was more fitting. The "best" cue has been replaced, and the person only remembers the answer that is most likely and believes they thought this was the best point the whole time.

Both SARA and RAFT descriptions include a memory trace impairment or cognitive distortion that is caused by the feedback of information and reconstruction of memory.

CMT is a non-formal theory based on work by many researchers to create a collaborative process model for hindsight bias that involves event outcomes. People try to make sense of an event that has not turned out how they expected by creating causal reasoning for the starting event conditions. This can give that person the idea that the event outcome was inevitable and there was nothing that could take place to prevent it from happening. CMT can be caused by a discrepancy between a person's expectation of the event and the reality of an outcome. They consciously want to make sense of what has happened and selectively retrieve memory that supports the current outcome. This causal attribution can be motivated by wanting to feel more positive about the outcome and possibly themselves.

=== Memory distortions ===
Hindsight bias has similarities to other memory distortions, such as misinformation effect and false autobiographical memory. Misinformation effect occurs after an event is witnessed; new information received after the fact influences how the person remembers the event, and can be called post-event misinformation. This is an important issue with eyewitness testimony. False autobiographical memory takes place when suggestions or additional outside information is provided to distort and change memory of events; this can also lead to false memory syndrome. At times this can lead to the creation of new memories that are completely false and have not taken place.

All three of these memory distortions contain a three-stage procedure. The details of each procedure are different, but all three can result in some form of psychological manipulation and alteration of memory. Stage one is different between the three paradigms, although all involve an event, an event that has taken place (misinformation effect), an event that has not taken place (false autobiographical memory), and a judgement made by a person about an event that must be remembered (hindsight bias). Stage two consists of more information that is received by the person after the event has taken place. The new information given in hindsight bias is correct and presented upfront to the person, while the extra information for the other two memory distortions is wrong and presented in an indirect and possibly manipulative way. The third stage consists of recalling the starting information. The person must recall the original information with hindsight bias and misinformation effect, while a person that has a false autobiographical memory is expected to remember the incorrect information as a true memory.

Cavillo (2013) tested whether there is a relationship between the amount of time the people performing the experiment gave the participants to respond and the participant's level of bias when recalling their initial judgements. The results showed that there is in fact a relationship; the hindsight bias index was greater among the participants who were asked to respond more rapidly than among the participants who were allowed more time to respond.

Distortions of autobiographical memory produced by hindsight bias have also been used as a tool to study changes in students' beliefs about paranormal phenomena after taking a university level skepticism course. In a study by Kane (2010), students in Kane's skepticism class rated their level of belief in a variety of paranormal phenomena at both the beginning and at the end of the course. At the end of the course, they also rated what they remembered their level of belief had been at the beginning of the course. The critical finding was that not only did students reduce their average level of belief in paranormal phenomena by the end of the course, but they also falsely remembered the level of belief they held at the beginning of the course, recalling a much lower level of belief than what they had initially rated. It is the latter finding that is a reflection of the operation of hindsight bias.

To create a false autobiographical memory, the person must believe a memory that is not real. To seem real, the information must be influenced by their personal judgments. There is no real episode of an event to remember, so this memory construction must be logical to that person's knowledge base. Hindsight bias and the misinformation effect recall a specific time and event; this is called an episodic memory process. These two memory distortions both use memory-based mechanisms that involve a memory trace that has been changed. Hippocampus activation takes place when an episodic memory is recalled. The memory is then available for alteration by new information. The person believes that the recalled information is the original memory trace, not an altered memory. This new memory is made from accurate information, and, therefore, the person does not have much motivation to admit that they were wrong originally by remembering the original memory. This can lead to motivated forgetting.

=== Motivated forgetting ===
Following a negative outcome of a situation, people do not want to accept responsibility. Instead of accepting their role in the event, they might either view themselves as caught up in a situation that was unforeseeable with them therefore not being the culprits (this is referred to as defensive processing) or view the situation as inevitable with there therefore being nothing that could have been done to prevent it (this is retroactive pessimism). Defensive processing involves less hindsight bias, as they are playing ignorant of the event. Retroactive pessimism makes use of hindsight bias after a negative, unwanted outcome. Events in life can be hard to control or predict. It is no surprise that people want to view themselves in a more positive light and do not want to take responsibility for situations they could have altered. This leads to hindsight bias in the form of retroactive pessimism to inhibit upward counterfactual thinking, instead interpreting the outcome as succumbing to an inevitable fate.

This memory inhibition that prevents a person from recalling what happened may lead to failure to accept mistakes, and therefore may make someone unable to learn and grow to prevent repeating the mistake. Hindsight bias can also lead to overconfidence in decisions without considering other options. Such people see themselves as persons who remember correctly, even though they are just forgetting that they were wrong. Avoiding responsibility is common among the human population. Examples are discussed below to show the regularity and severity of hindsight bias in society.

== Consequences ==
Hindsight bias has both positive and negative consequences. The bias also plays a role in the process of decision-making within the medical field.

=== Positive ===
Positive consequences of hindsight bias is an increase in one's confidence and performance, as long as the bias distortion is reasonable and does not create overconfidence. Another positive consequence is that one's self-assurance of their knowledge and decision-making, even if it ends up being a poor decision, can be beneficial to others; allowing others to experience new things or to learn from those who made the poor decisions.

=== Negative ===
Hindsight bias causes overconfidence in one's performance relative to others. Hindsight bias decreases one's rational thinking because of when a person experiences strong emotions, which in turn decreases rational thinking. Another negative consequence of hindsight bias is the interference of one's ability to learn from experience, as a person is unable to look back on past decisions and learn from mistakes. A third consequence is a decrease in sensitivity toward a victim by the person who caused the wrongdoing. The person demoralizes the victim and does not allow for a correction of behaviors and actions.

=== Medical decision-making ===
Hindsight bias may lead to overconfidence and malpractice in regards to physicians. Hindsight bias and overconfidence is often attributed to the number of years of experience the physician has. After a procedure, physicians may have a "knew it the whole time" attitude, when in reality they may not have known it. Medical decision support systems are designed to assist physicians in diagnosis and treatment, and have been suggested as a way to counteract hindsight bias. However, these decision support systems come with drawbacks, as going against a recommended decision resulted in more punitive jury outcomes when physicians were found liable for causing harm.

== Visual hindsight bias ==
Hindsight bias has also been found to affect judgments regarding the perception of visual stimuli, an effect referred to as the "I saw it all along" phenomenon. This effect has been demonstrated experimentally by presenting participants with initially very blurry images of celebrities. Participants then viewed the images as the images resolved to full clarity (Phase 1). Following Phase 1, participants predicted the level of blur at which a peer would be able to make an accurate identification of each celebrity. It was found that, now that the identity of the celebrities in each image was known, participants significantly overestimated the ease with which others would be able to identify the celebrities when the images were blurry.

The phenomenon of visual hindsight bias has important implications for a form of malpractice litigation that occurs in the field of radiology. Typically, in these cases, a radiologist is charged with having failed to detect the presence of an abnormality that was present in a radiology image. During litigation, a different radiologist – who now knows that the image contains an abnormality – is asked to judge how likely it would be for a naive radiologist to have detected the abnormality during the initial reading of the image. This kind of judgement directly parallels the judgments made in hindsight bias studies. Consistent with the hindsight bias literature, it has been found that abnormalities are, in fact, more easily detected in hindsight than foresight. In the absence of controls for hindsight bias, testifying radiologists may overestimate the ease with which the abnormality would have been detected in foresight.

== Attempts to reduce hindsight bias ==
Research suggests that people still exhibit the hindsight bias even when they are aware of it or possess the intention of eradicating it. There is no solution to eliminate hindsight bias in its totality, but only ways to reduce it. Some of these include considering alternative explanations or opening one's mind to different perspectives. The only observable way to decrease hindsight bias in testing is to have the participant think about how alternative hypotheses could be correct. As a result, the participant would doubt the correct hypothesis and report not having chosen it.

Given that researchers' attempts to eliminate hindsight bias have failed, some believe there is a possible combination of motivational and automatic processes in cognitive reconstruction. Incentive prompts participants to use more effort to recover even the weak memory traces. This idea supports the causal model theory and the use of sense-making to understand event outcomes.

== Individual differences ==
A multinomial processing tree (MPT) model was used to identify processes underlying the phenomenon of hindsight bias (HB). A 2015 study extended HB by incorporating individual differences in cognitive function into estimates of core parameters of the model for older and younger adults, the MPT model. The findings suggest that (1) in the absence of outcome knowledge, better episodic memory is associated with higher recall, (2) Better episodic memory and inhibitory control and higher working memory abilities were associated with higher recall abilities in the presence of knowledge of the outcome, (3) Better inhibitory control is associated with less reconstruction bias. Despite a similar pattern of effects in young adults, cognitive covariates did not significantly predict the underlying HB process in this age group. Overall, the findings of this study suggest that working memory capacity and inhibitory control contribute to individual differences in recall bias and reconstruction bias, respectively, especially in older adults.

== Mental illness ==
=== Schizophrenia ===
Schizophrenia is an example of a disorder that directly affects the hindsight bias. Individuals with schizophrenia are more strongly affected by the hindsight bias than are individuals from the general public.

The hindsight bias effect is a paradigm that demonstrates how recently acquired knowledge influences the recollection of past information. Recently acquired knowledge has a strange but strong influence on schizophrenic individuals in relation to information previously learned. New information combined with rejection of memories can disconfirm behavior and delusional belief, which is typically found in patients with schizophrenia. This can cause faulty memory, which can lead to hindsight thinking and believing in knowing something they do not. Delusion-prone individuals with schizophrenia can falsely jump to conclusions. Jumping to conclusions can lead to hindsight, which strongly influences the delusional conviction in individuals with schizophrenia. In numerous studies, cognitive functional deficits in schizophrenic individuals impair their ability to represent and uphold contextual processing.

=== Post-traumatic stress disorder ===
Post-traumatic stress disorder (PTSD) is the re-experiencing and avoidance of trauma-related stressors, emotions, and memories from a past event or events that has cognitive dramatizing impact on an individual. PTSD can be attributed to the functional impairment of the prefrontal cortex (PFC) structure. Dysfunctions of cognitive processing of context and abnormalities that PTSD patients often have can affect hindsight thinking, such as in combat soldiers perceiving they could have altered outcomes of events in war. The PFC and dopamine systems are parts of the brain that can be responsible for the impairment in cognitive control processing of context information. The PFC is well known for controlling the thought process in hindsight bias that something will happen when it evidently does not. Brain impairment in certain brain regions can also affect the thought process of an individual who may engage in hindsight thinking.

Cognitive flashbacks and other associated features from a traumatic event can trigger severe stress and negative emotions such as unpardonable guilt. For example, studies were done on trauma-related guilt characteristics of war veterans with chronic PTSD. Although there has been limited research, significant data suggests that hindsight bias has an effect on war veterans' personal perception of wrongdoing, in terms of guilt and responsibility from traumatic events of war. They blame themselves, and, in hindsight, perceive that they could have prevented what happened.

== Components of hindsight bias ==
Research has suggested that hindsight bias comprises three forms: memory distortion, inevitability, and foreseeability. These components have been conceptualized as hierarchically organized levels, in which lower-level processes involve memory reconstruction (e.g., memory distortion), whereas higher-level processes reflect broader inferential beliefs about the predictability and inevitability of events (e.g., foreseeability). Memory distortion (e.g., "I said it would happen") refers to the incorrect recollection of one's prior judgments so that they appear closer to the actual outcome than they originally were. Inevitability reflects beliefs about the objective state of the world, such as the perception that an outcome was bound to occur, often expressed as the sense that events "had to happen" given the circumstances. Foreseeability involves the belief that one personally could have predicted the outcome in advance, producing the subjective feeling of having "known it all along." These three components are conceptually distinct but represent related aspects of hindsight bias.

Hindsight bias is related to metacognition, as it involves judgments about one's own prior knowledge and predictive ability.

== Measuring hindsight bias ==
Hindsight bias is commonly measured using two main experimental designs: the memory design and the hypothetical design.

In the memory design, individuals first provide an initial judgment, are later given the correct outcome, and then asked to recall their original response. Hindsight bias is reflected in the extent to which recalled judgments shift toward the known outcome. For example, an individual may estimate that Mozart was born in 1710, then learn that he was born in 1756, and later recall having estimated 1740.

In the hypothetical design, individuals are informed of the correct outcome and asked to estimate what they or a naive individual would have predicted had they not known the outcome. For example, an individual learns that the Statue of Liberty is 151 feet from base to torch and is then asked to estimate what a naive individual would say, responding "250 feet."

Within these designs, hindsight bias is often quantified using difference scores and model-based measures. Difference scores capture the extent to which judgments shift toward the known outcome relative to original judgments, with larger shifts indicating greater hindsight bias. Model-based measures aim to disentangle the cognitive processes that are associated with hindsight bias, such as recollection bias, reconstruction bias, and source confusion, by estimating the contributions of these processes to individuals' judgments.

== Examples ==
=== Healthcare system ===
Accidents are prone to happen in any human undertaking, but accidents occurring within the healthcare system seem more salient and severe because of their profound effect on the lives of those involved and sometimes result in the death of a patient. In the healthcare system, there are a number of methods in which specific cases of accidents that happened are being reviewed by others who already know the outcome of the case. Those methods include morbidity and mortality conferences, autopsies, case analysis, medical malpractice claims analysis, staff interviews, and even patient observation. Hindsight bias has been shown to cause difficulties in measuring errors in these cases. Many of the errors are considered preventable after the fact, which clearly indicates the presence and the importance of a hindsight bias in this field. There are two sides in the debate in how these case reviews should be approached to best evaluate past cases: the error elimination strategy and the safety management strategy. The error elimination strategy aims to find the cause of errors, relying heavily on hindsight (therefore more subject to the hindsight bias). The safety management strategy relies less on hindsight (less subject to hindsight bias) and identifies possible constraints during the decision-making process of that case. However, it is not immune to error.

=== Judicial system ===
Hindsight bias results in being held to a higher standard in court. The defense is particularly susceptible to these effects since their actions are the ones being scrutinized by the jury. The hindsight bias causes defendants to be judged as capable of preventing the bad outcome. Although much stronger for the defendants, hindsight bias also affects the plaintiffs. In cases that there is an assumption of risk, hindsight bias may contribute to the jurors perceiving the event as riskier because of the poor outcome. That may lead the jury to feel that the plaintiff should have exercised greater caution in the situation. Both effects can be minimized if attorneys put the jury in a position of foresight, rather than hindsight, through the use of language and timelines. Judges and juries are likely to mistakenly view negative events as being more foreseeable than what it was in the moment when they look at the situation after the fact in court. Encouraging people to explicitly think about the counterfactuals was an effective means of reducing the hindsight bias. In other words, people became less attached to the actual outcome and were more open to consider alternative lines of reasoning prior to the event. Judges involved in fraudulent transfer litigation cases were subject to the hindsight bias as well and resulted in an unfair advantage for the plaintiff, showing that jurors are not the only ones sensitive to the effects of the hindsight bias in the courtroom.

=== Wikipedia ===
Since hindsight leads people to focus on information that is consistent with what happened while inconsistent information is ignored or regarded as less relevant, it is likely included in representations about the past as well. In a study of Wikipedia articles the latest article versions before the event (foresight article versions) were compared to two hindsight article versions: the first online after the event took place and another one eight weeks later. To be able to investigate various types of events, even including disasters (such as the nuclear disaster at Fukushima), for which foresight articles do not exist, the authors made use of articles about the structure that suffered damage in those instances (such as the article about the nuclear power plant of Fukushima). When analyzing to what extent the articles were suggestive of a particular event, they found only articles about disasters to be much more suggestive of the disaster in hindsight than in foresight, which indicated hindsight bias. For the remaining event categories, however, Wikipedia articles did not show any hindsight bias. In an attempt to compare individuals' and Wikipedia's hindsight bias more directly, another study came to the conclusion that Wikipedia articles are less susceptible to hindsight bias than individuals' representations.

=== Economy and business ===
Financial bubbles are often heavily biased with hindsight after they burst. After the worldwide dot-com bubble of the late 1990s and the Great Recession of 2008, many economists have suggested that conditions that seemed insignificant at the time were harbingers of future financial collapse. According to economist Richard Thaler, executives and entrepreneurs are particularly prone to hindsight bias. For example, in one study, more than 75% of entrepreneurs whose startups eventually failed predicted that their businesses would succeed. However, when asked again after their startup failed, only 58% said they had originally believed their startup would be a success. Hindsight bias can also contribute to startup failure through biased performance evaluations and overentry into competition. Hindsight-biased performance evaluation is also related to inefficient delegation. Additionally, hindsight bias affects judgment of business cases in court. A study by Strohmeier et al. (2020) found, that professional legal investigators (such as judges, lawyers and bankers with legal background) are perceptible to hindsight bias when judging the foreseeability of bankruptcy and assessing the legal responsibility of the CEO. Participants were presented with one of three hypothetical bankruptcy cases, which contained either no statement about the ending of the case, a positive outcome or a negative outcome. Depending on the presented ending, judgements about whether the CEO was to blame and about the possibility to predict the outcome, were significantly different. This can possibly result in an unjustifiably stricter judgement of bankruptcy cases in real life scenarios.

=== Investment industry ===
Hindsight bias influences the decisions of investors in the investment sector. Investors tend to be overconfident in predicting the future because we mistakenly believe that we have predicted the present in the past, so we assume that the future will follow our predictions. Overconfidence is the killer for investment returns. Biais et al. show that hindsight bias allows people to underestimate the magnitude of volatility and that investment agents with hindsight bias have worse investment return performance. Research suggests that the main cause of hindsight bias is that no investor can remember how they made their decisions at the time. Therefore, in order to invest more rationally and safely, investors should keep a diary of the influences, outcomes and show why those outcomes were achieved when making their investment decisions. However, the diary approach largely prevents investors from forgetting conditions that have led to insight bias and overconfidence. The process of writing down the investment approach still leads to overconfidence, but the study found that it does not have an overall negative effect on current returns.

== See also ==
- Confirmation bias – Bias confirming existing attitudes
- Curse of knowledge – Cognitive bias of assuming others share your knowledge
- Egg of Columbus – 16th-century anecdote about hindsight
- Historian's fallacy – Type of informal fallacy
- Memory conformity – Phenomenon in memory
- Observational error – Difference between a measured value of a quantity and its true value
- Outcome bias – Decision-making bias
- Sampling bias – Bias in the sampling of a population
- Selection bias – Bias in a statistical analysis due to non-random selection
- Metacognition – Self-awareness about thinking, higher-order thinking skills
