= Group polarization =

Tendency of a group to make more extreme decisions than the inclinations of its members

In social psychology, group polarization refers to the tendency for a group to make decisions that are more extreme than the initial inclination of its members. These more extreme decisions are towards greater risk if individuals' initial tendencies are to be risky and towards greater caution if individuals' initial tendencies are to be cautious. The phenomenon also holds that a group's attitude toward a situation may change in the sense that the individuals' initial attitudes have strengthened and intensified after group discussion, a phenomenon known as attitude polarization.

== Overview ==
Group polarization is an important phenomenon in social psychology and is observable in many social contexts. For example, a group of women who hold moderately feminist views tend to demonstrate heightened pro-feminist beliefs following group discussion. Similarly, studies have shown that after deliberating together, mock jury members often decided on punitive damage awards that were either larger or smaller than the amount any individual juror had favored prior to deliberation. The studies indicated that when the jurors favored a relatively low award, discussion would lead to an even more lenient result, while if the jury was inclined to impose a stiff penalty, discussion would make it even harsher. Moreover, in recent years, the Internet and online social media have also presented opportunities to observe group polarization and compile new research. Psychologists have found that social media outlets such as Facebook and Twitter demonstrate that group polarization can occur even when a group is not physically together. As long as the group of individuals begins with the same fundamental opinion on the topic and a consistent dialogue is kept going, group polarization can occur.

Research has suggested that well-established groups suffer less from polarization, as do groups discussing problems that are well known to them. However, in situations where groups are somewhat newly formed and tasks are new, group polarization can demonstrate a more profound influence on decision-making.

== Attitude polarization ==
Attitude polarization, also known as belief polarization and the polarization effect, is a phenomenon in which a disagreement becomes more extreme as the different parties consider evidence on the issue. It is one of the effects of confirmation bias: the tendency of people to search for and interpret evidence selectively, to reinforce their current beliefs or attitudes. When people encounter ambiguous evidence, this bias can potentially result in each of them interpreting it as in support of their existing attitudes, widening rather than narrowing the disagreement between them.

The effect is observed with issues that activate emotions, such as political "hot-button" issues. For most issues, new evidence does not produce a polarization effect. For those issues where polarization is found, mere thinking about the issue, without contemplating new evidence, produces the effect. Social comparison processes have also been invoked as an explanation for the effect, which is increased by settings in which people repeat and validate each other's statements. This apparent tendency is of interest not only to psychologists, but also to sociologists and philosophers.

=== Empirical findings ===
Since the late 1960s, psychologists have carried out a number of studies on various aspects of attitude polarization.

In 1979, Charles Lord, Lee Ross and Mark Lepper performed a study in which they selected two groups of people, one group strongly in favor of capital punishment, the other strongly opposed. The researchers initially measured the strength with which people held their position. Later, both the pro- and anti-capital punishment people were put into small groups and shown one of two cards, each containing a statement about the results of a research project written on it. For example:

Kroner and Phillips (1977) compared murder rates for the year before and the year after adoption of capital punishment in 14 states. In 11 of the 14 states, murder rates were lower after adoption of the death penalty. This research supports the deterrent effect of the death penalty.

or:

Palmer and Crandall (1977) compared murder rates in 10 pairs of neighboring states with different capital punishment laws. In 8 of the 10 pairs, murder rates were higher in the state with capital punishment. This research opposes the deterrent effect of the death penalty.

The researchers again asked people about the strength of their beliefs about the deterrence effect of the death penalty, and, this time, also asked them about the effect that the research had had on their attitudes.

In the next stage of the research, the participants were given more information about the study described on the card they received, including details of the research, critiques of the research, and the researchers' responses to those critiques. The participants' degree of commitment to their original positions were re-measured, and the participants were asked about the quality of the research and the effect the research had on their beliefs. Finally, the trial was rerun on all participants using a card that supported the opposite position to that they had initially seen.

The researchers found that people tended to believe that research that supported their original views had been better conducted and was more convincing than research that didn't. Whichever position they held initially, people tended to hold that position more strongly after reading research that supported it. Lord et al. point out that it is reasonable for people to be less critical of research that supports their current position, but it seems less rational for people to significantly increase the strength of their attitudes when they read supporting evidence. When people had read both the research that supported their views and the research that did not, they tended to hold their original attitudes more strongly than before they received that information. These results should be understood in the context of several problems in the implementation of the study, including the fact the researchers changed the scaling of the outcome of the variable, so measuring attitude change was impossible, and measured polarization using a subjective assessment of attitude change and not a direct measure of how much change had occurred.

== Choice shifts ==
Group polarization and choice shifts are similar in many ways; however, they differ in one distinct way. Group polarization refers to attitude change on the individual level due to the influence of the group, and choice shift refers to the outcome of that attitude change; namely, the difference between the average group members' pre-group discussion attitudes and the outcome of the group decision.

Risky and cautious shifts are both a part of a more generalized idea known as group-induced attitude polarization. Though group polarization deals mainly with risk-involving decisions and/or opinions, discussion-induced shifts have been shown to occur on several non-risk-involving levels. This suggests that a general phenomenon of choice-shifts exists apart from only risk-related decisions. Stoner (1968) found that a decision is impacted by the values behind that circumstances of the decision. The study found that situations that normally favor the more risky alternative increased risky shifts. More so, situations that normally favor the cautious alternative increased cautious shifts. These findings also show the importance of previous group shifts. Choice shifts are mainly explained by largely differing human values and how highly these values are held by an individual. According to Moscovici et al. (1972) interaction within a group and differences of opinion are necessary for group polarization to take place. While an extremist in the group may sway opinion, the shift can only occur with sufficient and proper interaction within the group. In other words, the extremist will have no impact without interaction. Also, Moscovici et al. found individual preferences to be irrelevant; it is differences of opinion which will cause the shift. This finding demonstrates how one opinion in the group will not sway the group; it is the combination of all the individual opinions that will make an impact.

== History and origins ==
The study of group polarization can be traced back to an unpublished 1961 Master's thesis by MIT student James Stoner, who observed the so-called "risky shift". The concept of risky shift maintains that a group's decisions are riskier than the average of the individual decisions of members before the group met.

In early studies, the risky-shift phenomenon was measured using a scale known as the Choice-Dilemmas Questionnaire. This measure required participants to consider a hypothetical scenario in which an individual is faced with a dilemma and must make a choice to resolve the issue at hand. Participants were then asked to estimate the probability that a certain choice would be of benefit or risk to the individual being discussed. Consider the following example:

"Mr. A, an electrical engineer, who is married and has one child, has been working for a large electronics corporation since graduating from college five years ago. He is assured of a lifetime job with a modest, though adequate, salary and liberal pension benefits upon retirement. On the other hand, it is very unlikely that his salary will increase much before he retires. While attending a convention, Mr. A is offered a job with a small, newly founded company which has a highly uncertain future. The new job would pay more to start and would offer the possibility of a share in the owner- ship if the company survived the competition of the larger firms."

Participants were then asked to imagine that they were advising Mr. A. They would then be provided with a series of probabilities that indicate whether the new company that offered him a position is financially stable. It would read as following

"Please check the lowest probability that you would consider acceptable to make it worthwhile for Mr. A to take the new job."

____The chances are 1 in 10 that the company will prove financially sound.

____The chances are 3 in 10 that the company will prove financially sound.

____The chances are 5 in 10 that the company will prove financially sound.

____The chances are 7 in 10 that the company will prove financially sound.

____The chances are 9 in 10 that the company will prove financially sound.

____Place a check here if you think Mr. A should not take the new job no matter what the probabilities.

Individuals completed the questionnaire and made their decisions independently of others. Later, they would be asked to join a group to reassess their choices. Indicated by shifts in the mean value, initial studies using this method revealed that group decisions tended to be relatively riskier than those that were made by individuals. This tendency also occurred when individual judgments were collected after the group discussion and even when the individual post-discussion measures were delayed two to six weeks.

The discovery of the risky shift was considered surprising and counter-intuitive, especially since earlier work in the 1920s and 1930s by Allport and other researchers suggested that individuals made more extreme decisions than did groups, leading to the expectation that groups would make decisions that would conform to the average risk level of its members. The seemingly counter-intuitive findings of Stoner led to a spurt of research around the risky shift, which was originally thought to be a special case exception to the standard decision-making practice. Many people had concluded that people in a group setting would make decisions based on what they assumed to be the overall risk level of a group; because Stoner's work did not necessarily address this specific theme, and because it does seem to contrast Stoner's initial definition of risky shift, additional controversy arose leading researchers to further examine the topic. By the late 1960s, however, it had become clear that the risky shift was just one type of many attitudes that became more extreme in groups, leading Moscovici and Zavalloni to term the overall phenomenon "group polarization."

Subsequently, a decade-long period of examination of the applicability of group polarization to a number of fields in both lab and field settings began. There is a substantial amount of empirical evidence demonstrating the phenomenon of group polarization. Group polarization has been widely considered as a fundamental group decision-making process and was well established, but remained non-obvious and puzzling because its mechanisms were not fully understood.

== Major theoretical approaches ==
Almost as soon as the phenomenon of group polarization was discovered, a number of theories were offered to help explain and account for it. These explanations were gradually narrowed down and grouped together until two primary mechanisms remained, social comparison and informational influence.

=== Social comparison theory ===
The social comparison theory, or normative influence theory, has been widely used to explain group polarization. According to the social comparison interpretation, group polarization occurs as a result of individuals' desire to gain acceptance and be perceived in a favorable way by their group. The theory holds that people first compare their own ideas with those held by the rest of the group; they observe and evaluate what the group values and prefers. In order to gain acceptance, people then take a position that is similar to everyone else's but slightly more extreme. In doing so, individuals support the group's beliefs while still presenting themselves as admirable group "leaders". The presence of a member with an extreme viewpoint or attitude does not further polarize the group. Studies regarding the theory have demonstrated that normative influence is more likely with judgmental issues, a group goal of harmony, person-oriented group members, and public responses.

=== Informational influence ===
Informational influence, or persuasive arguments theory, has also been used to explain group polarization, and is most recognized by psychologists today. The persuasive arguments interpretation holds that individuals become more convinced of their views when they hear novel arguments in support of their position. The theory posits that each group member enters the discussion aware of a set of items of information or arguments favoring both sides of the issue, but lean toward that side that boasts the greater amount of information. In other words, individuals base their individual choices by weighing remembered pro and con arguments. Some of these items or arguments are shared among the members while some items are unshared, in which all but one member has considered these arguments before. Assuming most or all group members lean in the same direction, during discussion, items of unshared information supporting that direction are expressed, which provides members previously unaware of them more reason to lean in that direction. Group discussion shifts the weight of evidence as each group member expresses their arguments, shedding light onto a number of different positions and ideas. Research has indicated that informational influence is more likely with intellective issues, a group goal of making correct decision, task-oriented group members, and private responses. Furthermore, research suggests that it is not simply the sharing of information that predicts group polarization. Rather, the amount of information and persuasiveness of the arguments mediate the level of polarization experienced.

In the 1970s, significant arguments occurred over whether persuasive argumentation alone accounted for group polarization. Daniel Isenberg's 1986 meta-analysis of the data gathered by both the persuasive argument and social comparison camps succeeded, in large part, in answering the questions about predominant mechanisms. Isenberg concluded that there was substantial evidence that both effects were operating simultaneously, and that persuasive arguments theory operated when social comparison did not, and vice versa.

=== Self-categorization and social identity ===
While these two theories are the most widely accepted as explanations for group polarization, alternative theories have been proposed. The most popular of these theories is self-categorization theory. Self-categorization theory stems from social identity theory, which holds that conformity stems from psychological processes; that is, being a member of a group is defined as the subjective perception of the self as a member of a specific category. Accordingly, proponents of the self-categorization model hold that group polarization occurs because individuals identify with a particular group and conform to a prototypical group position that is more extreme than the group mean. In contrast to social comparison theory and persuasive argumentation theory, the self-categorization model maintains that inter-group categorization processes are the cause of group polarization

Support for the self-categorization theory, which explains group polarization as conformity to a polarized norm, was found by Hogg, Turner, and Davidson in 1990. In their experiment, participants gave pre-test, post-test, and group consensus recommendations on three choice dilemma item-types (risky, neutral, or cautious). The researchers hypothesized that an ingroup confronted by a risky outgroup will polarize toward caution, an ingroup confronted by a caution outgroup will polarize toward risk, and an ingroup in the middle of the social frame of reference, confronted by both risky and cautious outgroups, will not polarize but will converge on its pre-test mean. The results of the study supported their hypothesis in that participants converged on a norm polarized toward risk on risky items and toward caution on cautious items. Another similar study found that in-group prototypes become more polarized as the group becomes more extreme in the social context. This further lends support to the self-categorization explanation of group polarization.

== Applications ==
=== The Internet ===
The rising popularity and increased number of online social media platforms, such as Facebook, Twitter and Instagram, has enabled people to seek out and share ideas with others who have similar interests and common values, making group polarization effects increasingly evident, particularly in Millennial and Generation Z individuals. Similar to the social media platforms, video streaming platforms like YouTube are forming groups unconsciously through intelligent algorithm seeking for extreme contents. Owing to this technology, it is possible for individuals to curate their sources of information and the opinions to which they are exposed, thereby reinforcing and strengthening their own views while effectively avoiding information and perspectives with which they disagree.

One study analyzed over 30,000 tweets on Twitter regarding the shooting of George Tiller, a late term abortion doctor, where the tweets analyzed were conversations among supporters and opponents of abortion rights, post shooting. The study found that like-minded individuals strengthened group identity whereas replies between different-minded individuals reinforced a split in affiliation.

In a study conducted by Sia et al. (2002), group polarization was found to occur with online (computer-mediated) discussions. In particular, this study found that group discussions, conducted when discussants are in a distributed (cannot see one another) or anonymous (cannot identify one another) environment, can lead to even higher levels of group polarization compared to traditional meetings. This is attributed to the greater numbers of novel arguments generated (due to persuasive arguments theory) and higher incidence of one-upmanship behaviors (due to social comparison).

However, some research suggests that important differences arise in measuring group polarization in laboratory versus field experiments. A study conducted by Taylor & MacDonald (2002) featured a realistic setting of a computer-mediated discussion, but group polarization did not occur at the level expected. The study's results also showed that groupthink occurs less in computer-mediated discussions than when people are face to face. Moreover, computer-mediated discussions often fail to result in a group consensus, or lead to less satisfaction with the consensus that was reached, compared to groups operating in a natural environment. Furthermore, the experiment took place over a two-week period, leading the researchers to suggest that group polarization may occur only in the short-term. Overall, the results suggest that not only may group polarization not be as prevalent as previous studies suggest, but group theories, in general, may not be simply transferable when seen in a computer-related discussion.

=== Politics and law ===
Group polarization has been widely discussed in terms of political behavior (see political polarization). Researchers have identified an increase in affective polarization among the United States electorate, and report that hostility and discrimination towards the opposing political party has increased dramatically over time.

Group polarization is similarly influential in legal contexts. A study that assessed whether Federal district court judges behaved differently when they sat alone, or in small groups, demonstrated that those judges who sat alone took extreme action 35% of the time, whereas judges who sat in a group of three took extreme action 65% of the time. These results are noteworthy because they indicate that even trained, professional decision-makers are subject to the influences of group polarization.

=== War and violent behavior ===
Group polarization has been reported to occur during wartime and other times of conflict and helps to account partially for violent behavior and conflict. Researchers have suggested, for instance, that ethnic conflict exacerbates group polarization by enhancing identification with the ingroup and hostility towards the outgroup. While polarization can occur in any type of conflict, it has its most damaging effects in large-scale inter-group, public policy, and international conflicts.

=== College life ===
On a smaller scale, group polarization can also be seen in the everyday lives of students in higher education. A study by Myers in 2005 reported that initial differences among American college students become more accentuated over time. For example, students who do not belong to fraternities and sororities tend to be more liberal politically, and this difference increases over the course of their college careers. Researchers theorize that this is at least partially explained by group polarization, as group members tend to reinforce one another's proclivities and opinions.

== See also ==
- Confirmation bias
- Deindividuation
- Group-serving bias
- Groupthink
- Herd behavior and herd mentality
- Identity politics
- Groupshift
