= Egocentric bias =

Psychological phenomenon

Egocentric bias is the tendency to rely too heavily on one's own perspective or to have a higher opinion of oneself than reality. It has been linked to psychological motivations related to self-enhancement and has been shown to influence memory processes. Empirical studies have demonstrated that information consistent with an individual's existing beliefs, experiences, or self-concept is more readily recalled, contributing to an egocentric outlook. Michael Ross and Fiore Sicoly first identified this cognitive bias in their 1979 paper, "Egocentric Biases in Availability and Attribution". Egocentric bias is referred to by most psychologists as a general umbrella term under which other related phenomena fall.

The effects of egocentric bias can differ based on personal characteristics, such as age and the number of languages one speaks. Thus far, there have been many studies focusing on specific implications of egocentric bias in different contexts. Research on collaborative group tasks have emphasized that people view their own contributions differently than they view that of others. Other areas of research have been aimed at studying how mental health patients display egocentric bias, and at the relationship between egocentric bias and voter distribution. These types of studies surrounding egocentric bias usually involve written or verbal questionnaires, based on the subject's personal life or their decision in various hypothetical scenarios.

== History and analysis ==
The term "egocentric bias" was first coined in 1980 by Anthony Greenwald, a psychologist at The Ohio State University. He described it as a phenomenon in which people skew their beliefs so that what they recall from their memory or what they initially understood is different than what actually occurred. He cites research by Rogers, Kuiper, and Kirker, who explain that the self-reference effect is the ability of people to recall information better if they think about how the information will affect them during the encoding process (recording memories in their brain). Greenwald argues that the self-reference effect causes people to exaggerate their role in a situation. Furthermore, information is better encoded, and thus people are more likely to suffer from egocentric bias, if they produce information actively rather than passively, such as by having a direct role in the outcome of a situation.

Egocentric bias occurs when people fail to consider situations from other people's perspectives. Egocentric bias has influenced ethical judgements to the point where people not only believe that self-interested outcomes are preferential but are also the morally sound way to proceed. People are more inclined to be aware of their own behaviors since they can use their thoughts and emotions to gain more information about themselves. These thoughts and emotions can affect how people view themselves in relation to others in specific situations. A common example arises when people are asked to explain how much credit should be given to each person in a collaborative project. Daniel Schacter, a psychology professor at Harvard University, considers egocentric bias as one of the "seven sins" of memory and essentially reflects the prominent role played by the self when encoding and retrieving episodic memories. As such, people often feel that their contributions to a collaborative project are greater than those of other members, since people tend to focus more on how much they have done.

In social context, egocentric bias influences people to choose a social circle that is capable of maintaining one's positive traits. Studies show that one's choice of friend or social circle is likely to be dependent on the amount of positive feedback received.

== Examples ==
In a 1993 study conducted in Japan, subjects were asked to write down fair or unfair behaviors that they themselves or others did. When writing about fair behavior, they tended to start with the word "I" rather than "others". Likewise, they began unfair behaviors with "others" rather than "I". This demonstrates that people tend to attribute successes and positive behaviors to themselves, while placing the burden of failures and negative behaviors on others. Furthermore, in this study there were gender differences detected; Japanese women, compared to men, remembered the behaviors of others more than their own, and were also more likely to attribute fair or unfair behavior to others than to themselves.

Another study found that egocentric bias influences perceived fairness. Subjects felt that overpayment to themselves were more fair than overpayment to others; by contrast, they felt the underpayment to themselves were less fair than underpayment to others. Greenberg's studies showed that this egocentrism was eliminated when the subjects were put in a self-aware state, which was applied in his study with a mirror being placed in front of the subjects. When a person is not self-aware, they perceive that something can be fair to them but not necessarily fair to others. Therefore, fairness was something biased and subjective. When a person is self-aware, there is a uniform standard of fairness and there is no bias. When made self-aware, subjects rated overpayment and underpayment to both themselves and to others as equally unfair. It is believed that these results were obtained because self-awareness elevated subjects' concerns about perceived fairness in payment, thereby overriding egocentric tendencies.

The egocentric bias can also be clearly observed in young children, especially those who have not yet developed theory of mind, or the ability to understand concrete situations from the perspective of others. In one study by Wimmer and Perner, a child and a stuffed animal were presented with two differently colored boxes and both are shown that one contains an object of interest. The experimenter then removed the stuffed animal from the room and moved the object into the other box. When asked where the stuffed animal should search for the object, the children overwhelmingly tended to point to the box that they knew the object was in. Rather than thinking about the animal's perspective, the children displayed an egocentric bias in assuming that the animal would share their point of view, even though the animal had no way of knowing the same information as them.

== Causes ==
The causes and motivations for egocentric bias were investigated in a 1983 journal entry by Brian Mullen of Murray State University. Inspired by the study by Ross et al. demonstrating the false consensus effect, Mullen's paper focused on the overestimation of consensus. Mullen analyzed the NBC television show "Play the Percentages" to determine whether egocentric bias was rooted in a perceptual and unintentional distortion of reality versus a conscious, intentional motivation to appear normalized. Subjects in this analysis were contestants from the show, 20–30 year old middle class married couple with equal gender distribution. At the start of each show, studio audiences were asked several trivia questions, and the percentage of correct answers was recorded for later use in the game. During each round of the game, opposing contestants estimated the percentage of correct answers. The contestant who had a closer estimate wins the percentage of correct answer as a score, and then if they answer said trivia question correctly, wins the remaining percentage for a maximum possible 100 points. The first couple to win 300 points received a cash prize, with the opportunity to win more prizes in bonus rounds. Thus, the show provided incentive for unbiased estimates of consensus. Statistical analysis of the collected data showed that the "egocentric bias of false consensus was observed in spite of the potent incentive for unbiased estimates of consensus." This analysis ultimately supports the hypothesis that egocentric bias is a result of unintentional perceptual distortion of reality rather than a conscious, intentional motivation to appear normalized.

From a psychological standpoint, memories appear to be stored in the brain in an egocentric manner: the role of oneself is magnified in one's experiences to make them more personally relevant and thereby easier to recall. Early childhood memories, therefore, may be more difficult to recall since one's sense of self is less developed, so old memories do not connect as strongly to oneself as newer ones. Moreover, egocentric bias may have evolved from hunter-gatherer times, in which communities were small and interdependent enough that individuals could assume that others around them had very similar outlooks. An egocentric view would have reduced cognitive load and increased communication efficiency.

== Effects of personal characteristics ==
=== Age ===
A 2016 study published by Riva, Triscoli, Lamm, Carnaghi, and Silani found that egocentric bias tends to be experienced in a much greater degree by adolescents and older adults than by young and middle aged adults. They examined the emotional effect of visuo-tactile stimulation on pairs of participants from a population of 114 female of varying ages. The varying degree of egocentric bias with age was attributed to the developmental cycle of the right supramarginal gyrus (rSMG) of the parietal lobe, which finishes developing at the end of adolescence and decays early.

=== Bilingualism ===
Recent studies of egocentric bias have been done in many different subgroups of people, such as bilingual people. A study done by Paula Rubio-Fernández and Sam Glucksberg found that bilingual people are less prone to egocentric bias because they have grown to pay more attention to others' thoughts. Thus, it is less difficult for them to differentiate between their own opinions and those of others.

== Related phenomena ==
=== False-consensus effect ===
Considered to be a facet of egocentric bias, the false-consensus effect states that people believe their thoughts, actions, and opinions are much more common than they are in reality. When people are asked to make an estimate of a population's statistic, they often only have data from themselves and tend to assume that others in the population are similar to them due to egocentric bias. In turn, people tend to overestimate the extent to which their opinion is shared by the rest of the population. Moreover, people tend to believe that those who differ in opinion must be part of a minority and that the majority actually agrees with them. Therefore, the false-consensus effect, or the tendency to deduce judgements from one's own opinions, is a direct result of egocentric bias.

A well known example of false-consensus effect is a study published by Ross, Greene and House in 1977. Students are asked to walk around a campus with a sandwich board that bearing the word "repent". People who agreed to do so (50%) estimated that most of their peers would also agree to do so (average estimation 63.5%). Conversely, those who refused to do the experiment reported that most of their peers would refuse as well.

People who exhibit the false consensus effect take egocentric bias a step further: they not only forgo thinking of other perspectives, but they believe that their viewpoints are those accepted by the majority of people. Nevertheless, some psychologists do not distinguish between egocentric bias and the false consensus effect. For example, in the paper published by Ross, Greene, and House, the terms "false consensus" and "egocentric attribution bias" are used interchangeably. In the second part of their study, they gave out a questionnaire which asked participants which option (out of two choices) they would choose in specified situations, and what percentage of the population would choose which option. In all four scenarios that were given, subjects rated the option that they chose as the most probable. Ross, Greene, and House conclude that their results support the false consensus hypothesis, and that "intuitive estimates of deviance and normalcy, and the host of social inferences and interpersonal responses that accompany such estimates, are systematically and egocentrically biased in accord with his own behavioral choices."

=== Self-serving bias ===
A related concept to egocentric bias is self-serving bias, in which one takes undue credit for achievements and blames failures on external forces. However, egocentric bias differs from self-serving bias in that egocentric bias is rooted in an erroneous assumption of other's perception of reality, while self-serving bias is an erroneous perception of one's own reality. For example, consider a student who earns a low grade in a class. Self-serving bias would result in the assumption that the student's low grade is a result of poor teaching, which would direct the fault of one's reality away from one's own actions.

Egocentric bias might also result in an overestimation of the number of students that received low grades in the class for the purpose to normalize these students' performance. However, similar to the false-consensus effect, the self-serving bias and the egocentric bias have also been used as interchangeable terms.

Both concepts may be the product of individualistic cultures that usually stress independence and personal achievement over group-oriented success. Cross-cultural studies have found a strong presence of the egocentric bias in the primarily individualistic American, South African, and Yugoslavian communities, but noted the opposite effect in the collectivistic Japanese, Nepali, and Indian societies. People from these cultures tend to demonstrate a bias toward modesty, in which success is attributed to external or group-related factors and failures are seen as the result of personal shortcomings.

=== Bayesian inference ===
Bayesian reasoning is a form of statistical inference that relies on Bayes' rule to make probability prediction based on given information. In Bayesian updating, people use prior probabilities to make estimates, and then gradually change these probabilities as they gain more information. Bayesian inference is often used by psychologists to determine whether subjects who exhibit the false-consensus effect have a rational thought process. To understand Bayes' rule, consider an example from an experiment by Kreuger and Clement: there is an urn with 100 chips, some blue and some red, and then subjects are told that the first chip drawn from the urn is blue. Subjects are asked to estimate the probability that the urn contains predominantly blue chips. Using Bayes' rule, the probability that a blue chip is drawn given that the urn contains predominantly blue chips is equal to the probability of the urn being predominantly blue multiplied by the probability of the urn being predominantly blue given that a blue chip was drawn, all divided by the probability that the urn is predominantly blue. Most participants overestimated the requested probability. Data shows that subjects tend not to pay attention to sample size when making probability predictions. For example, although it has statistically been proven by the law of large numbers that larger samples have less variability, people tend to claim that large and small samples have the same amount of variability. Studies like the urn experiment above provide evidence that the false-consensus effect is not entirely rational, and that egocentric viewpoints tend to be predominant.

== Real-world implications ==
=== Collaboration ===
Egocentric bias can lead to the devaluation of peer contributions and the amplification of one's own work when in a collaborative setting. For example, when group members have been asked to report what percentage of the output they created, the total summed to greater than 100%. Usually, individuals are more easily able to recall their personal contributions and thus believe them to greater or more important. This applies to both positive and negative inputs: in a study of married couples, each spouse rated themselves as more responsible for helpful (cleaning) and detractive activities (causing arguments). Research has shown that feelings of sibling caregivers and their siblings depend on the contact between siblings and their feelings of closeness. Each of these two groups believed that their siblings contributed less to the needs of their family than themselves, and were more resistant to increasing these types of contributions. The closer that siblings were to each other, measured through observation and self reports, the smaller the extent of egocentric bias they felt in reporting each sibling's contribution.

=== Mental health ===
An overly exaggerated or extremely low demonstration of egocentric bias could be an indicator of mental illness. Those with anxiety tend to view themselves as the center of all events around them, regardless of their nature or how unrelated they are to oneself. On the other hand, people suffering from depression may have a lower tendency towards egocentricity, as evidenced by the fact that they tend to more realistically rate their contributions to group work, while non-depressed participants often overreport their additions.

=== Voting ===
The egocentric bias has also been shown to contribute to a citizen's decision to vote in elections. Firstly, people tend to view their personal choice between voting and abstinence as a reflection of those who support the same candidates and issues. Secondly, although each individual vote has very little power in large-scale elections, those who vote overestimate the significance of their ballot. Moreover, citizens demonstrate egocentric bias, in conjunction with the false-consensus effect, in their predictions of election outcomes. A study examining the 2008 American presidential election found that the more strongly people favor a certain candidate, the higher they estimate that candidate's likelihood of winning the election. For instance, those who strongly preferred Barack Obama predicted that he had a 65% chance of becoming the president, while those who preferred another candidate approximated that he only had a 40% chance of victory.

== General and cited references ==
- Epley, Nicholas; Caruso, Eugene M. (2004). "Egocentric Ethics" (PDF). Social Justice Research. 17 (2): 171–187. doi:10.1023/B:SORE.0000027408.72713.45. S2CID 85505615. Archived from the original (PDF) on 2014-10-14.
