= Charles Lord =

Acting Comptroller of the Currency
- In office 1981–1981
- Preceded by: John G. Heimann
- Succeeded by: C. T. Conover

Personal details
- Born: April 26, 1928 New York City, U.S.
- Died: January 8, 1993 (aged 64) Bridgeport, Connecticut, U.S.
- Children: 4
- Education: Yale University

Charles Edwin Lord II also known as Charles E. Lord (April 26, 1928 in New York City – January 8, 1993 in Bridgeport, Connecticut) was an investment banker and appointed Vice-Chairman of the Export-Import Bank of the United States of the United States by President Reagan. He also worked in the Office of the Comptroller of the Currency for the United States government, and became the acting Comptroller in 1981. After leaving the Office of the Comptroller Charles worked in the private sector becoming chairman and chief executive of the Prudential Bank and Trust Company. Concurrently he was a senior adviser with Dillon Read & Company. Later he was Vice Chairman of the Madison Financial Group. He had been a principal of Lord & Associates beginning in 1989.

He was the son of William Galey Lord and Francis Norton. His maternal aunt was Marie Norton Harriman. He attended Yale University being selected in his junior year to become a member of Skull and Bones in 1949, the year he graduated with B.A. He received an M.A.H. in 1976 from Yale. He had four children with his wife Margaret Plunkett Lord.

Also, he was on the membership list of the Council on Foreign Relations in 1985 which publishes the popular magazine Foreign Affairs. His relative, Winston Lord, former Ambassador to China, was President of the Council on Foreign Relations from 1977 to 1985.

== Other Positions ==
Director of Institutional Relations and Alumni Program for Yale University from 1979 until 1979.

Positions in Hartford National Bank and Trust Co. Became manager of Constitution Plaza office (in Hartford, Conn.) 1962 Manager of the International Department 1962. Senior Vice President of the Loan and Investment Division in 1966. President in 1967.

CIA (Chief Executive Officer) in 1972.

Elected President of the Hartford National Corporation in 1969. Vice Chairman 1972, President and CEO in 1975

Banker's Association for Foreign Trade, Director from 1969–1971

Connecticut Regional Export Expansion Council of the Department of Commerce, Chairman 1969-1971
