= False consensus effect =

Attributional type of cognitive bias

In psychology, the false consensus effect, also known as consensus bias, is a pervasive cognitive bias that causes people to overestimate the extent to which other people share their beliefs and views; it is the tendency to "see their own behavioral choices and judgments as relatively common and appropriate to existing circumstances". In other words, they assume that their personal qualities, characteristics, beliefs, and actions are relatively widespread through the general population.

This false consensus is significant because it increases self-esteem (overconfidence effect). This bias is especially prevalent in group settings where one thinks the collective opinion of their own group matches that of the larger population. Since the members of a group reach a consensus and rarely encounter those who dispute it, they tend to believe that everybody thinks the same way. The false-consensus effect is not restricted to cases where people believe that their values are shared by the majority, but it still manifests as an overestimate of the extent of their belief. Additionally, when confronted with evidence that a consensus does not exist, people often assume that those who do not agree with them are defective in some way.

The false consensus effect has been widely observed and supported by empirical evidence. One recent study has shown that consensus bias may improve decisions about other people's preferences. Ross, Green and House first defined the false consensus effect in 1977 with emphasis on the relative commonness that people perceive about their own responses; however, similar projection phenomena had already caught attention in psychology. Specifically, concerns with respect to connections between individual's personal predispositions and their estimates of peers appeared in the literature for a while. For instance, Katz and Allport in 1931 illustrated that students’ estimates of the frequency of cheating by others was positively correlated to their own behavior. Later, around 1970, the same phenomena were found on political beliefs and prisoner's dilemma situation. In 2017, researchers identified a persistent egocentric bias when participants learned about other people's snack-food preferences. Moreover, recent studies suggest that the false consensus effect can also affect professional decision makers; specifically, it has been shown that even experienced marketing managers project their personal product preferences onto consumers.

== Possible causes ==
There is no single cause for this cognitive bias; however, several underlying mechanisms have been suggested to contribute to its formation and maintenance. Previous research has suggested that cognitive and perceptional factors (motivated projection, accessibility of information, emotion, etc.) may contribute to the consensus bias, while recent studies have focused on its neural mechanisms. The bias may also result, at least in part, from non-social stimulus-reward associations.

=== Cognitive mechanisms ===
Cognitive mechanisms, such as the availability heuristic, self-serving bias, and naïve realism have been suggested as at least partial underlying factors in the False Consensus Effect. The availability heuristic is a mental shortcut that people default to, in which people may incorrectly attribute the likelihood or commonness of something based on how cognitively available the concept is to them, or how quickly it comes to mind; this could contribute to the False Consensus Effect when individuals have a readily available concept, causing them to overestimate its commonality. Self-serving bias is an attribution error that describes the tendency to attribute successes and positive traits to one's own internal factors, and attribute failures or negative traits to the external environment. This can contribute to the False Consensus Effect by justifying our actions with self-serving bias, and consequently using the False Consensus Effect to reinforce that those actions were acceptable by believing our views are widely shared. Naïve realism is the idealist belief that we perceive the world accurately, and individuals who disagree with our perceptions are incorrect or biased; this contributes to the False Consensus Effect by reinforcing that people who disagree with our view are part of the minority, whereas the majority still agrees with us.

=== Normative social influence ===
The False Consensus Effect can be partially attributed to the innate desire to conform and be liked by others in a social environment by sharing characteristics with members of a social group, within the parameters determined by the social environment; these parameters can be influenced by demographic factors, such as age, gender, and socioeconomic status, and cultural differences. The innate motivation to be liked is known as normative social influence, conceptualized by social psychologist Solomon Asch in 1951. Normative social influence is a social and evolutionary function to share characteristics with a group, form a group identity, and benefit from the protection and resources of group membership. It can cause the False Consensus Effect by creating a social illusion - the need to be liked causes one to agree with others outwardly even if they disagree internally, creating a social illusion of collective agreement. Additionally, the False Consensus Effect is fundamentally a perceptual effect; normative social influence motivates individuals to agree with each other, potentially leading some to believe that everyone getting along socially means that everyone agrees. Normative social influence also leads to people feeling validated in their beliefs when they are not challenged, reinforcing the illusion of correctness and group cohesion.

=== Informational social influence ===
Another type of social pressure to conform is informational social influence, also coined by Asch, that may contribute to the False Consensus Effect. This describes individuals' tendency to conform to a majority consensus out of the need to be correct; additionally, Asch posited that informational social influence is partially caused by people learning how to act within socially determined guidelines by perceiving others' behavior, allowing them to fall into the cohesive group identity. Maintenance of the False Consensus Effect may be related to the tendency to make decisions with relatively little information. When faced with uncertainty and a limited sample from which to make decisions, people often "project" themselves onto the situation. When this personal knowledge is used as input to make generalizations, it often results in the false sense of being part of the majority.

== Major theoretical approaches ==
The false-consensus effect can be traced back to two parallel theories of social perception, "the study of how we form impressions of and make inferences about other people". The first is the idea of social comparison. The principal claim of Leon Festinger's (1954) social comparison theory was that individuals evaluate their thoughts and attitudes based on other people. This may be motivated by a desire for confirmation and the need to feel good about oneself. Informational social influence can be viewed as an extension of this theory, where people may use others as sources of information to define social reality and guide behavior. This is called informational social influence. The problem, though, is that people are often unable to accurately perceive the social norm and the actual attitudes of others. In other words, research has shown that people are surprisingly poor "intuitive psychologists" and that our social judgments are often inaccurate. This finding helped to lay the groundwork for an understanding of biased processing and inaccurate social perception. The false-consensus effect is just one example of such an inaccuracy.

The second influential theory is projection, the idea that people project their own attitudes and beliefs onto others. This idea of projection is not a new concept. In fact, it can be found in Sigmund Freud's work on the defense mechanism of projection, D.S. Holmes' work on "attributive projection" (1968), and Gustav Ichheiser's work on social perception (1970). D.S. Holmes, for example, described social projection as the process by which people "attempt to validate their beliefs by projecting their own characteristics onto other individuals". In religious psychology, Ludwig Feuerbach (1804–1872) posited the Projection or Reflection theory of religion, in that human perceptions of the divine are projections of our own ideal qualities in order to conceptualize our aspirations.

Here, a connection can be made between the two stated theories of social comparison and projection. First, as social comparison theory explains, individuals constantly look to peers as a reference group and are motivated to do so in order to seek confirmation for their own attitudes and beliefs.

The false-consensus effect, as defined by Ross, Greene, and House in 1977, came to be the culmination of the many related theories that preceded it. In their well-known series of four studies, Ross and associates hypothesized and then demonstrated that people tend to overestimate the popularity of their own beliefs and preferences. Studies were both conducted in hypothetical situations by questionnaire surveys and in authentic conflict situations. For questionnaire studies, participants were presented with hypothetical events and then were not only asked to indicate their own behavioral choices and characteristics under the provided circumstances, but also asked to rate the responses and traits of their peers who referred as "actors". As for real occasion studies, participants were actually confronted with the conflict situations in which they were asked to choose behavioral alternatives and to judge the traits as well as decisions of two supposedly true individuals who had attended in the study. In general, the raters made more "extreme predictions" about the personalities of the actors that did not share the raters' own preference. In fact, the raters may have even thought that there was something wrong with the people expressing the alternative response.

In the ten years after the influential Ross et al. study, close to 50 papers were published with data on the false-consensus effect. Theoretical approaches were also expanded. The theoretical perspectives of this era can be divided into four categories: (a) selective exposure and cognitive availability, (b) salience and focus of attention, (c) logical information processing, and (d) motivational processes. In general, the researchers and designers of these theories believe that there is not a single right answer. Instead, they admit that there is overlap among the theories and that the false-consensus effect is most likely due to a combination of these factors.

=== Selective exposure and cognitive availability ===
This theory is closely tied to the availability heuristic, which suggests that perceptions of similarity (or difference) are affected by how easily those characteristics can be recalled from memory. And as one might expect, similarities between oneself and others are more easily recalled than differences. This is in part because people usually associate with those who are similar to themselves. This selected exposure to similar people may bias or restrict the "sample of information about the true diversity of opinion in the larger social environment". As a result of the selective exposure and availability heuristic, it is natural for the similarities to prevail in one's thoughts.

Botvin et al. (1992) did a popular study on the effects of the false-consensus effect among a specific adolescent community in an effort to determine whether students show a higher level of false-consensus effect among their direct peers as opposed to society at large. The participants of this experiment were 203 college students ranging in age from 18 to 25 (with an average age of 18.5). The participants were given a questionnaire and asked to answer questions regarding a variety of social topics. For each social topic, they were asked to answer how they felt about the topic and to estimate the percentage of their peers who would agree with them. The results determined that the false-consensus effect was extremely prevalent when participants were describing the rest of their college community; out of twenty topics considered, sixteen of them prominently demonstrated the false-consensus effect. The high levels of false-consensus effect seen in this study can be attributed to the group studied; because the participants were asked to compare themselves to a group of peers that they are constantly around (and view as very similar to themselves), the levels of false-consensus effect increased.

=== Salience and focus of attention ===
This theory suggests that when an individual focuses solely on their own preferred position, they are more likely to overestimate its popularity, thus falling victim to the false-consensus effect. This is because that position is the only one in their immediate consciousness. Performing an action that promotes the position will make it more salient and may increase the false-consensus effect. If, however, more positions are presented to the individual, the degree of the false-consensus effect might decrease significantly.

=== Logical information processing ===
This theory assumes that active and seemingly rational thinking underlies an individual's estimates of similarity among others. In a study done by Fox, Yinon, and Mayraz, researchers were attempting to determine whether or not the levels of the false-consensus effect changed in different age groups. In order to come to a conclusion, it was necessary for the researchers to split their participants into four different age groups. Two hundred participants were used, and gender was not considered to be a factor. Just as in the previous study mentioned, this study used a questionnaire as its main source of information. The results showed that the false-consensus effect was extremely prevalent in all groups, but was the most prevalent in the oldest age group (the participants who were labeled as "old-age home residents"). They showed the false-consensus effect in all 12 areas that they were questioned about. The increase in false-consensus effect seen in the oldest age group can be accredited to their high level of "logical" reasoning behind their decisions; the oldest age group has obviously lived the longest, and therefore feels that they can project their beliefs onto all age groups due to their (seemingly objective) past experiences and wisdom. The younger age groups cannot logically relate to those older to them because they have not had that experience and do not pretend to know these objective truths. These results demonstrate a tendency for older people to rely more heavily on situational attributions (life experience) as opposed to internal attributions.

=== Motivational processes ===
This theory stresses the benefits of the false-consensus effect: namely, the perception of increased social validation, social support, and self-esteem. It may also be useful to exaggerate similarities in social situations in order to increase liking.

== Belief in a favorable future ==
The concept of false consensus effect can also be extended to predictions about future others. Belief in a favorable future is the belief that future others will change their preferences and beliefs in alignment with one's own.

Rogers, Moore, and Norton (2017) find that belief in a favorable future is greater in magnitude than the false-consensus effect for two reasons:

1. It is based in future others whose beliefs are not directly observable, and
2. It is focused on future beliefs, which gives these future others time to "discover" the truth and change their beliefs.

== Cross-cultural perspectives ==
In more recent years, researchers have taken to exploring potential differences in how the false consensus effect manifests across cultures. While there is still a deficit in cross-cultural literature, growing empirical evidence posits differences in the strength and prevalence of the false consensus effect contingent on cultural context.

Broadly, research has found differences in the false consensus effect on the bases of individualism and collectivism. Individualistic cultures encourage distinguishing the self from others and expressing unique characteristics, whereas collectivistic cultures value group harmony and cohesion. One particularly well-studied cultural difference is the manner in which individuals construct and understand their sense of self, or self-concept. People in collectivistic cultures are found to have more interdependent self-concepts, in which the self is understood through relationships with close others. By contrast, people in individualistic cultures are found to have more independent self-concepts, in which the self is understood through personal characteristics that distinguish the self from others. Differences in individualism and collectivism, and more specifically self-concept, suggest differences in perceptions and social motivations that researchers theorize affect the influence of the false consensus effect.

Choi & Cha (2019) find differences in the strength of the false consensus effect based on domain. In studying Koreans and European Americans, they find that false consensus effects are stronger in Koreans regarding political beliefs, personal problems, and behavioural choices, but not personal traits and values. They suggest that these findings are a result of differences in individualism and collectivism, as they influence attribution and motivation. As collectivism places greater emphasis on situational factors, researchers posit that individuals from such cultures will assume situational factors are dictating behaviour more so than those from individualistic cultures, who are more likely to attribute behaviour to disposition. Thus, it is suggested that Koreans perceive greater similarity in domains with increased potential for social influence, as individuals perceive others as being similarly influenced by the situation. Further, it is suggested that in these same domains European Americans perceive less similarity as they view behaviours and opinions as resulting from an individual's personal characteristics. Additionally, they suggest that differences in perceived similarity across domains may be influenced by differences in consistency. Prior cross-cultural research finds that independence is motivated by self-consistency across contexts, while interdependence is motivated by consistency within social roles. The researchers thus posit that European Americans perceive similarity in personal traits and values, as they view these domains as more consistent. Further, they suggest that Koreans perceive greater similarity in domains that implicate others, as they understand consistency through social roles and relationships.

Similar research by Ott-Holland et al. (2014) finds evidence of greater false consensus in collectivistic cultures. Specifically, they look at institutional collectivism, in which action for collective purpose and benefit is valued over individual action. They find that people from countries high in institutional collectivism perceive more similarity between themselves and others than those from countries high in individualism. Researches posit that emphasis on collective action motivates perceptions of similarity. However, this effect was small and a limited number of countries were studied.

Overall, the existing empirical work provides evidence of notable cross-cultural differences in the false consensus effect. It generally appears that in certain contexts, false consensus is stronger in collectivistic cultures. Though, this facet of cross-cultural research is still developing, and the work thus far has been limited to specific collectivistic societies that cannot be generalized to all contexts.

== See also ==
- Abilene paradox
- Attribution bias – Systematic errors made when people evaluate their own and others' behaviors
- Confirmation bias – Bias confirming existing attitudes
- "The Engineering of Consent" – Essay and book by Edward Bernays
- False-uniqueness effect – Cognitive bias of wrongly viewing yourself as unique
- Fundamental attribution error – Psychological phenomenon
- Groupthink – Psychological phenomenon that occurs within a group of people
- Illusory superiority – Cognitive bias
- List of cognitive biases
- Manufacturing Consent – 1988 book by Edward S. Herman and Noam Chomsky
- Omission bias – Tendency to favor inaction over action
- Overconfidence effect – Personal cognitive bias
- Pauline Kael § Nixon quote – American film critic (1919–2001)
- Pluralistic ignorance – Incorrect perception of others' beliefs
- Pseudoconsensus
- Psychological projection – Attributing parts of the self to others
- Social comparison bias
- Social projection – Expecting others to act similarly to oneself
- Value (ethics)
