= Bias =

Inclination for or against

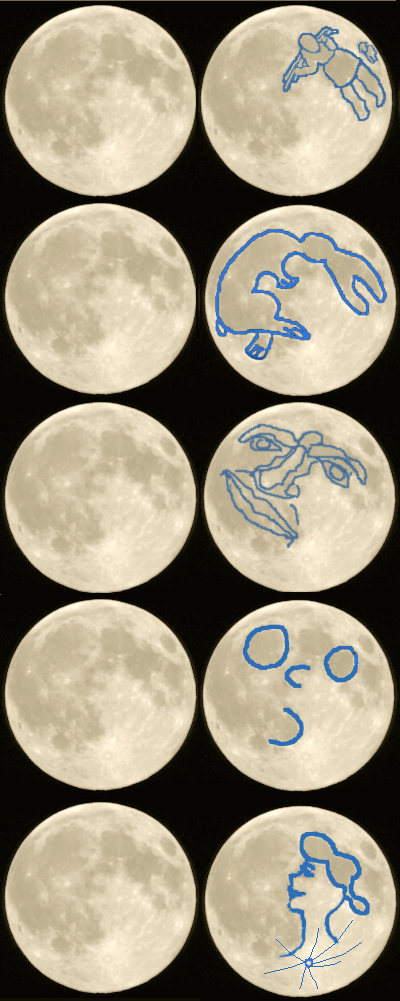
Interpretations of the random patterns of craters on the Moon. A common example of a perceptual bias caused by pareidolia.

Bias is a disproportionate weight in favor of or against an idea or thing, usually in a way that is inaccurate, closed-minded, prejudicial, or unfair. Biases can be innate or learned. People may develop biases for or against an individual, a group, or a belief. In science and engineering, a bias is a systematic error. Statistical bias results from an unfair sampling of a population, or from an estimation process that does not give accurate results on average.

== Etymology ==
The word appears to derive from Old Provençal into Old French biais, "sideways, askance, against the grain". Whence comes French biais, "a slant, a slope, an oblique".

It seems to have entered English via the game of bowls, where it referred to balls made with a greater weight on one side. Then, it expanded to the figurative use, "a one-sided tendency of the mind", and, at first especially in law, "undue propensity or prejudice". or ballast, used to lower the centre of gravity of a ship to increase stability and to keep the ship from one side.

== Types ==
=== Cognitive biases ===
A cognitive bias is a repeating or basic misstep in thinking, assessing, recollecting, or other cognitive processes. That is, a pattern of deviation from standards in judgment, whereby inferences may be created unreasonably. People create their own "subjective social reality" from their own perceptions, their view of the world may dictate their behaviour. Thus, cognitive biases may sometimes lead to perceptual distortion, inaccurate judgment, illogical interpretation, or what is broadly called irrationality. However some cognitive biases are taken to be adaptive, and thus may lead to success in the appropriate situation. Furthermore, cognitive biases as an example through education may allow faster choice selection when speedier outcomes for a task are more valuable than precision. Other cognitive biases are a "by-product" of human processing limitations, coming about because of an absence of appropriate mental mechanisms, or just from human limitations in information processing.

==== Anchoring ====
Anchoring is a psychological heuristic that describes the propensity to rely on the first piece of information encountered when making decisions. According to this heuristic, individuals begin with an implicitly suggested reference point (the "anchor") and make adjustments to it to reach their estimate. For example, the initial price offered for a used car sets the standard for the rest of the negotiations, so that prices lower than the initial price seem more reasonable even if they are still higher than what the car is worth.

==== Apophenia ====
Apophenia, also known as patternicity, or agenticity, is the human tendency to perceive meaningful patterns within random data. Apophenia is well documented as a rationalization for gambling. Gamblers may imagine that they see patterns in the numbers which appear in lotteries, card games, or roulette wheels. One manifestation of this is known as the "gambler's fallacy".

Pareidolia is the visual or auditory form of apophenia. It has been suggested that pareidolia combined with hierophany may have helped ancient societies organize chaos and make the world intelligible.

==== Attribution bias ====
An attribution bias could happen when individuals assess or attempt to discover explanations behind their own and others' behaviors. People make attributions about the causes of their own and others' behaviors; but these attributions do not necessarily precisely reflect reality. Rather than operating as objective perceivers, individuals are inclined to perceptual slips that prompt biased understandings of their social world. When judging others we tend to assume their actions are the result of internal factors such as personality, whereas we tend to assume our own actions arise because of the necessity of external circumstances. There are a wide range of sorts of attribution biases, such as the ultimate attribution error, fundamental attribution error, actor-observer bias, and self-serving bias.

Examples of attribution bias:

==== Confirmation bias ====
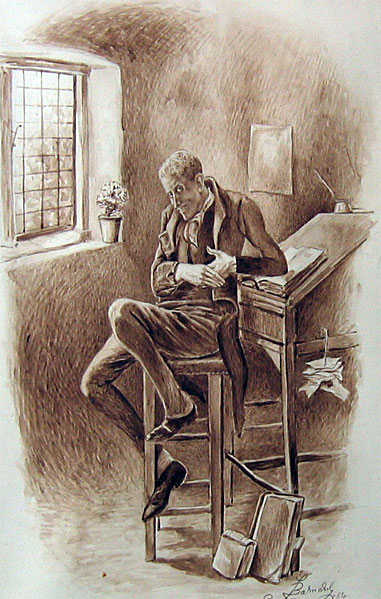
Confirmation bias has been described as an internal "yes man", echoing back a person's beliefs like Charles Dickens' character Uriah Heep.

Confirmation bias is the tendency to search for, interpret, favor, and recall information in a way that confirms one's beliefs or hypotheses while giving disproportionately less attention to information that contradicts it. The effect is stronger for emotionally charged issues and for deeply entrenched beliefs. People also tend to interpret ambiguous evidence as supporting their existing position. Biased search, interpretation and memory have been invoked to explain attitude polarization (when a disagreement becomes more extreme even though the different parties are exposed to the same evidence), belief perseverance (when beliefs persist after the evidence for them is shown to be false), the irrational primacy effect (a greater reliance on information encountered early in a series) and illusory correlation (when people falsely perceive an association between two events or situations). Confirmation biases contribute to overconfidence in personal beliefs and can maintain or strengthen beliefs in the face of contrary evidence. Poor decisions due to these biases have been found in political and organizational contexts.

==== Framing ====
Framing involves the social construction of social phenomena by various sources or influences, including (but not limited to) mass media, political/social movements, and political leaders. It is an influence over how people organize, perceive, and communicate about reality. It can be positive or negative, depending on the audience and what kind of information is being presented. For political purposes, framing often presents facts in such a way that implicates a problem that is in need of a solution. Members of political parties attempt to frame issues in a way that makes a solution favoring their own political leaning appear as the most appropriate course of action for the situation at hand. As understood in social theory, framing is a schema of interpretation, a collection of anecdotes and stereotypes, that individuals rely on to understand and respond to events. People use filters to make sense of the world, the choices they then make are influenced by their creation of a frame.

Cultural bias is the related phenomenon of interpreting and judging phenomena by standards inherent to one's own culture. Numerous such biases exist, concerning cultural norms for color, location of body parts, mate selection, concepts of justice, linguistic and logical validity, acceptability of evidence, and taboos. Ordinary people may tend to imagine other people as basically the same, not significantly more or less valuable, probably attached emotionally to different groups and different land.

==== Halo effect and horn effect ====
The halo effect and the horn effect are when an observer's overall impression of a person, organization, brand, or product influences their feelings about specifics of that entity's character or properties.

The name halo effect is based on the concept of the saint's halo, and is a specific type of confirmation bias, wherein positive sentiments in one area cause questionable or unknown characteristics to be seen positively. If the observer likes one aspect of something, they will have a positive predisposition toward everything about it. A person's appearance has been found to produce a halo effect. The halo effect is also present in the field of brand marketing, affecting perception of companies and non-governmental organizations (NGOs).

The opposite of the halo is the horn effect, when "individuals believe (that negative) traits are inter-connected." The term horn effect refers to Devil's horns. It works in a negative direction: if the observer dislikes one aspect of something, they will have a negative predisposition towards other aspects.

==== Self-serving bias ====
Self-serving bias is the tendency for cognitive or perceptual processes to be distorted by the individual's need to maintain and enhance self-esteem. It is the propensity to credit accomplishment to our own capacities and endeavors, yet attribute failure to outside factors, to dismiss the legitimacy of negative criticism, concentrate on positive qualities and accomplishments yet disregard flaws and failures. Studies have demonstrated that this bias can affect behavior in the workplace, in interpersonal relationships, playing sports, and in consumer decisions.

==== Status quo bias ====
Status quo bias is an emotional bias; a preference for the current state of affairs. The current baseline (or status quo) is taken as a reference point, and any change from that baseline is perceived as a loss. Status quo bias should be distinguished from a rational preference for the status quo ante, as when the current state of affairs is objectively superior to the available alternatives, or when imperfect information is a significant problem. A large body of evidence, however, shows that status quo bias frequently affects human decision-making.

=== Conflicts of interest ===
A conflict of interest is when a person or association has intersecting interests (financial, personal, etc.) which could potentially corrupt. The potential conflict is autonomous of actual improper actions, it can be found and intentionally defused before corruption, or the appearance of corruption, happens. "A conflict of interest is a set of circumstances that creates a risk that professional judgement or actions regarding a primary interest will be unduly influenced by a secondary interest." It exists if the circumstances are sensibly accepted to present a hazard that choices made may be unduly affected by auxiliary interests.

==== Corruption ====
A conflict of interest arises when a decision-maker participates in a corrupt act that seeks to influence the outcome in favor of a specific individual, organization, or entity in a decision-making process. For example, attempts to solicit a bribe or kickback in exchange for favoring a party creates a conflict of interest. A perceived conflict of interest may also arise in an individual who is offered such a payment, even if it is declined, particularly in situations where the attempt to bribe is not reported.

Laws restricting whether a monetary transaction is appropriate can differ between jurisdictions based upon their criminal laws. For example, some nations criminalize the receipt of political campaign contributions in the form of cash, while other nations permit cash donations provided that donors otherwise adhere to election law.

==== Favoritism ====
Favoritism, sometimes known as in-group favoritism, or in-group bias, refers to a pattern of favoring members of one's in-group over out-group members. This can be expressed in evaluation of others, in allocation of resources, and in many other ways. This has been researched by psychologists, especially social psychologists, and linked to group conflict and prejudice. Cronyism is favoritism of long-standing friends, especially by appointing them to positions of authority, regardless of their qualifications. Nepotism is favoritism granted to relatives.

==== Lobbying ====
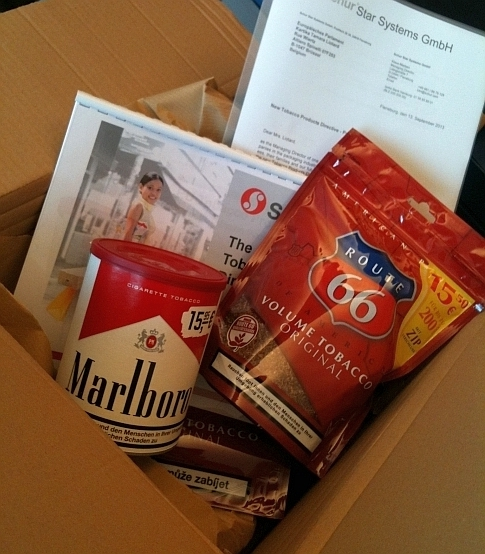
Box offered by tobacco lobbyists to Dutch Member of the European Parliament Kartika Liotard in September 2013

Lobbying is the attempt to influence choices made by administrators, frequently lawmakers or individuals from administrative agencies. Lobbyists may be among a legislator's constituencies, or not; they may engage in lobbying as a business, or not. Lobbying is often spoken of with contempt, the implication is that people with inordinate socioeconomic power are corrupting the law in order to serve their own interests. When people who have a duty to act on behalf of others, such as elected officials with a duty to serve their constituents' interests or more broadly the common good, stand to benefit by shaping the law to serve the interests of some private parties, there is a conflict of interest. This can lead to all sides in a debate looking to sway the issue by means of lobbyists.

==== Regulatory issues ====
Self-regulation is the process whereby an organization monitors its own adherence to legal, ethical, or safety standards, rather than have an outside, independent agency such as a third party entity monitor and enforce those standards. Self-regulation of any group can create a conflict of interest. If any organization, such as a corporation or government bureaucracy, is asked to eliminate unethical behavior within their own group, it may be in their interest in the short run to eliminate the appearance of unethical behavior, rather than the behavior itself.

Regulatory capture is a form of political corruption that can occur when a regulatory agency, created to act in the public interest, instead advances the commercial or political concerns of special interest groups that dominate the industry or sector it is charged with regulating. Regulatory capture occurs because groups or individuals with a high-stakes interest in the outcome of policy or regulatory decisions can be expected to focus their resources and energies in attempting to gain the policy outcomes they prefer, while members of the public, each with only a tiny individual stake in the outcome, will ignore it altogether. Regulatory capture is a risk to which a regulatory agency is exposed by its very nature.

==== Shilling ====
Shilling is deliberately giving spectators the feeling that one is an energetic autonomous client of a vendor for whom one is working. The effectiveness of shilling relies on crowd psychology to encourage other onlookers or audience members to purchase the goods or services (or accept the ideas being marketed). Shilling is illegal in some places, but legal in others. An example of shilling is paid reviews that give the impression of being autonomous opinions.

=== Statistical biases ===
Statistical bias is a systematic tendency in the process of data collection, which results in lopsided, misleading results. This can occur in any of a number of ways, in the way the sample is selected, or in the way data are collected. It is a property of a statistical technique or of its results whereby the expected value of the results differs from the true underlying quantitative parameter being estimated.

==== Forecast bias ====
A forecast bias is when there are consistent differences between results and the forecasts of those quantities; that is: forecasts may have an overall tendency to be too high or too low.

==== Observer-expectancy effect ====
The observer-expectancy effect is when a researcher's expectations cause them to subconsciously influence the people participating in an experiment. It is usually controlled using a double-blind system, and was an important reason for the development of double-blind experiments.

==== Reporting bias and social desirability bias ====
In epidemiology and empirical research, reporting bias is defined as "selective revealing or suppression of information" of undesirable behavior by subjects or researchers. It refers to a tendency to under-report unexpected or undesirable experimental results, while being more trusting of expected or desirable results. This can propagate, as each instance reinforces the status quo, and later experimenters justify their own reporting bias by observing that previous experimenters reported different results.

Social desirability bias is a bias within social science research where survey respondents can tend to answer questions in a manner that will be viewed positively by others. It can take the form of over-reporting laudable behavior, or under-reporting undesirable behavior. This bias interferes with the interpretation of average tendencies as well as individual differences. The inclination represents a major issue with self-report questionnaires; of special concern are self-reports of abilities, personalities, sexual behavior, and drug use.

==== Selection bias ====
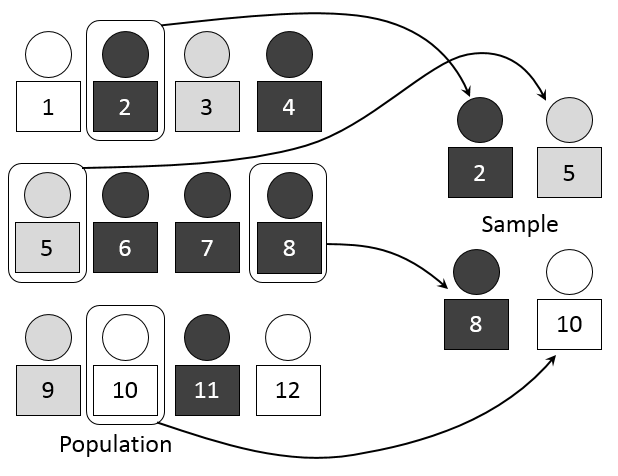
Sampling is supposed to collect of a representative sample of a population.

Selection bias is the conscious or unconscious bias introduced into a study by the way individuals, groups or data are selected for analysis, if such a way means that true randomization is not achieved, thereby ensuring that the sample obtained is not representative of the population intended to be analyzed. This results in a sample that may be significantly different from the overall population.

=== Prejudices ===
Bias and prejudice are usually considered to be closely related. Prejudice is prejudgment, or forming an opinion before becoming aware of the relevant facts of a case. The word is often used to refer to preconceived, usually unfavorable, judgments toward people or a person because of gender, political opinion, social class, age, disability, religion, sexuality, race/ethnicity, language, nationality, or other personal characteristics. Prejudice can also refer to unfounded beliefs and may include "any unreasonable attitude that is unusually resistant to rational influence".

==== Ageism ====
Ageism is the stereotyping and/or discrimination against individuals or groups on the basis of their age. It can be used in reference to prejudicial attitudes towards older people, or towards younger people.

==== Classism ====
Classism is discrimination on the basis of social class. It includes attitudes that benefit the upper class at the expense of the lower class, or vice versa.

==== Lookism ====
Lookism is stereotypes, prejudice, and discrimination on the basis of physical attractiveness, or more generally to people whose appearance matches cultural preferences. Many people make automatic judgments of others based on their physical appearance that influence how they respond to those people.

==== Racism and Sexism ====
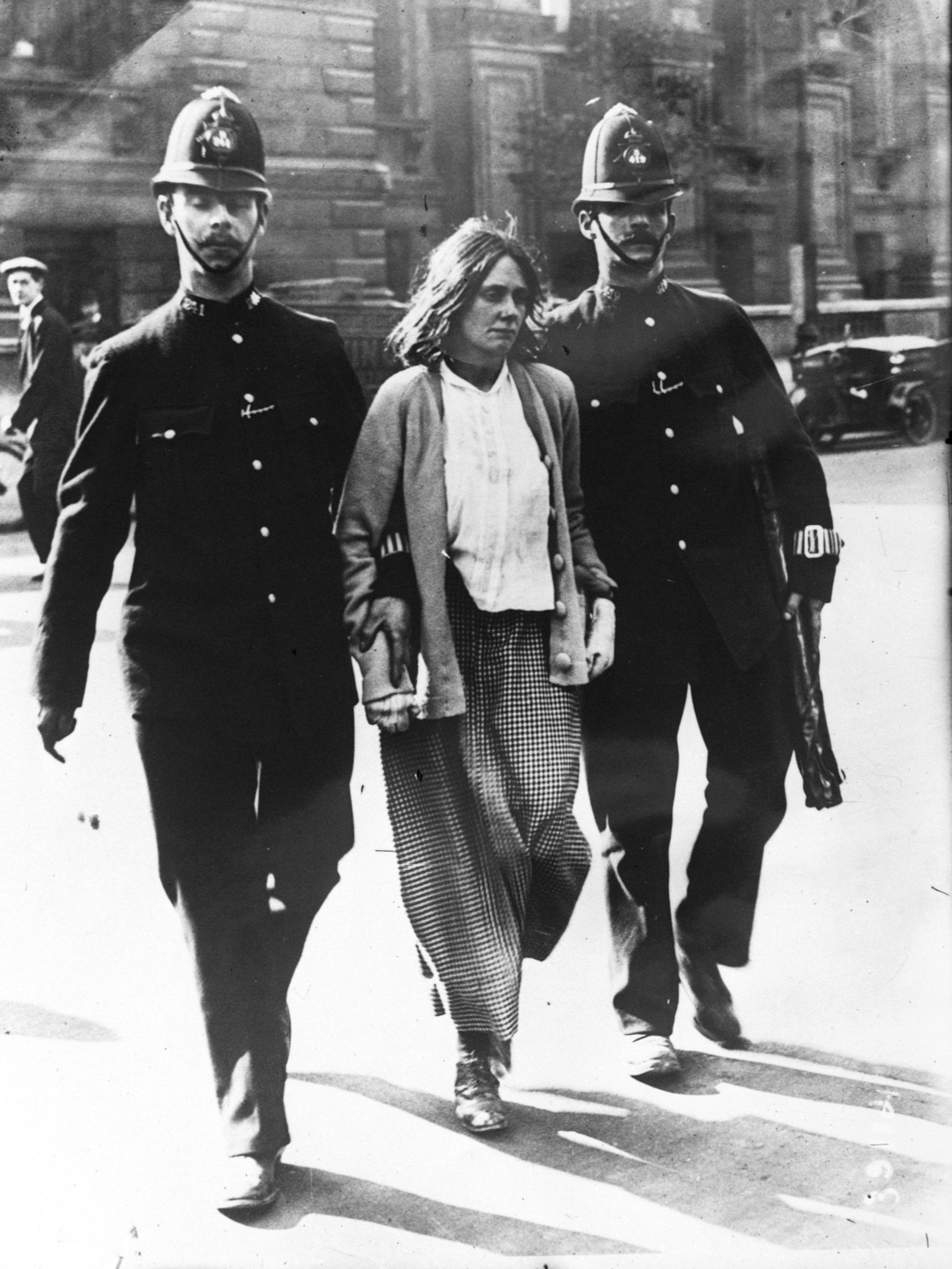
Suffragette Dora Thewlis was arrested by the Metropolitan Police in 1914 for campaigning for women's right to vote.

Sexism is prejudice or discrimination based on one's sex or gender. Sexism can affect anyone, but primarily affects women and girls. It has been linked to gender roles and stereotypes, and may include the belief that one sex or gender is intrinsically superior to another. Extreme sexism may foster sexual harassment, rape, and other forms of sexual violence. Discrimination in this context is defined as discrimination toward people based on their gender identity or their gender or sex differences. Sexism refers to violation of equal opportunities (formal equality) based on gender or refers to violation of equality of outcomes based on gender, also called substantive equality. Sexism may arise from social or cultural customs and norms.

Racism sources:

== Contextual biases ==
=== Biases in academia ===
==== Academic bias ====
Academic bias is the bias or perceived bias of scholars allowing their beliefs to shape their research and the scientific community. Claims of bias are often linked to claims by conservatives of pervasive bias against political conservatives and religious Christians. Some have argued that these claims are based upon anecdotal evidence which would not reliably indicate systematic bias, and have suggested that this divide is due to self-selection of conservatives choosing not to pursue academic careers. There is some evidence that perception of classroom bias may be rooted in issues of sexuality, race, class and sex as much or more than in religion.

==== Experimenter bias ====
In science research, experimenter bias occurs when experimenter expectancies regarding study results bias the research outcome. Examples of experimenter bias include conscious or unconscious influences on subject behavior including creation of demand characteristics that influence subjects, and altered or selective recording of experimental results themselves. It can also involve asking leading probes and not neutrally redirecting the subject back to the task when they ask for validation or questions.

==== Funding bias ====
Funding bias refers to the tendency of a scientific study to support the interests of the study's financial sponsor. This phenomenon is recognized sufficiently that researchers undertake studies to examine bias in past published studies. It can be caused by any or all of: a conscious or subconscious sense of obligation of researchers towards their employers, misconduct or malpractice, publication bias, or reporting bias.

==== Full text on net bias ====
Full text on net (or FUTON) bias is a tendency of scholars to cite academic journals with open access—that is, journals that make their full text available on the internet without charge—in their own writing as compared with toll access publications. Scholars can more easily discover and access articles that have their full text on the internet, which increases authors' likelihood of reading, quoting, and citing these articles, this may increase the impact factor of open access journals relative to journals without open access.

The related bias, no abstract available bias (NAA bias) is scholars' tendency to cite journal articles that have an abstract available online more readily than articles that do not.

==== Publication bias ====
Publication bias is a type of bias with regard to what academic research is likely to be published because of a tendency among researchers and journal editors to prefer some outcomes rather than others (e.g., results showing a significant finding), which leads to a problematic bias in the published literature. This can propagate further as literature reviews of claims about support for a hypothesis will themselves be biased if the original literature is contaminated by publication bias. Studies with significant results often do not appear to be superior to studies with a null result with respect to quality of design. However, statistically significant results have been shown to be three times more likely to be published compared to papers with null results.

=== Biases in law enforcement ===
==== Driving while black ====
Driving while black refers to the racial profiling of African American drivers. The phrase implies that a motorist might be pulled over by a police officer, questioned, and searched, because of a racial bias.

==== Racial profiling ====
Racial profiling, or ethnic profiling, is the act of suspecting or targeting a person of a certain race on the basis of racially observed characteristics or behavior, rather than on individual suspicion. Racial profiling is commonly referred to regarding its use by law enforcement, and its leading to discrimination against minorities.

==== Victim blaming ====
Victim blaming occurs when the victim of a wrongful act is held at fault for the harm that befell them. The study of victimology seeks to mitigate the perception of victims as responsible.

=== Biases in media ===
Media bias is the bias or perceived bias of journalists and news producers within the mass media in the selection of events, the stories that are reported, and how they are covered. The term generally implies a pervasive or widespread bias violating the standards of journalism, rather than the perspective of an individual journalist or article. The level of media bias in different nations is debated. There are also watchdog groups that report on media bias.

Practical limitations to media neutrality include the inability of journalists to report all available stories and facts, the requirement that selected facts be linked into a coherent narrative, government influence including overt and covert censorship, the influence of the owners of the news source, concentration of media ownership, the selection of staff, the preferences of an intended audience, and pressure from advertisers.

Bias has been a feature of the mass media since its birth with the invention of the printing press. The expense of early printing equipment restricted media production to a limited number of people. Historians have found that publishers often served the interests of powerful social groups.

==== Agenda setting ====
Agenda setting describes the capacity of the media to focus on particular stories, if a news item is covered frequently and prominently, the audience will regard the issue as more important. That is, its salience will increase.

==== Gatekeeping ====
Gatekeeping is the way in which information and news are filtered to the public, by each person or corporation along the way. It is the "process of culling and crafting countless bits of information into the limited number of messages that reach people every day, and it is the center of the media's role in modern public life. [...] This process determines not only which information is selected, but also what the content and nature of the messages, such as news, will be."

==== Sensationalism ====
Sensationalism is when events and topics in news stories and pieces are overhyped to present skewed impressions of events, which may cause a misrepresentation of the truth of a story. Sensationalism may involve reporting about insignificant matters and events, or the presentation of newsworthy topics in a trivial or tabloid manner contrary to the standards of professional journalism.

=== Other contexts ===
==== Educational bias ====
Bias in education refers to real or perceived bias in the educational system. The content of school textbooks is often the issue of debate, as their target audience is young people, and the term "whitewashing" is used to refer to selective removal of critical or damaging evidence or comment. Religious bias in textbooks is observed in countries where religion plays a dominant role. There can be many forms of educational bias. Some overlooked aspects, occurring especially with the pedagogical circles of public and private schools—sources that are unrelated to fiduciary or mercantile impoverishment which may be unduly magnified—include teacher bias as well as a general bias against women who are going into STEM research.

==== Inductive bias ====
Inductive bias occurs within the field of machine learning. In machine learning one seeks to develop algorithms that are able to learn to anticipate a particular output. To accomplish this, the learning algorithm is given training cases that show the expected connection. Then the learner is tested with new examples. Without further assumptions, this problem cannot be solved exactly as unknown situations may not be predictable. The inductive bias of the learning algorithm is the set of assumptions that the learner uses to predict outputs given inputs that it has not encountered. It may bias the learner towards the correct solution, the incorrect, or be correct some of the time. A classical example of an inductive bias is Occam's Razor, which assumes that the simplest consistent hypothesis is the best.

==== Insider trading ====
Insider trading is the trading of a public company's stock or other securities (such as bonds or stock options) by individuals with access to non-public information about the company. In various countries, trading based on insider information is illegal because it is seen as unfair to other investors who do not have access to the information as the investor with insider information could potentially make far larger profits that a typical investor could make.

==== Match fixing ====
In organized sports, match fixing occurs when a match is played to a completely or partially pre-determined result, violating the rules of the game and often the law. There is a variety of reasons for this, but the most common is in exchange for a payoff from gamblers. Players might also intentionally perform poorly to get an advantage in the future (such as a better draft pick, or an easier opponent in a playoff), or to rig a handicap system. Match-fixing generally refers to fixing the final result of the game. Another form of match-fixing, known as spot-fixing, involves fixing small events within a match which can be gambled upon, but which are unlikely to prove decisive in determining the final result of the game.

=== Implicit bias ===
An implicit bias, or implicit stereotype, is the unconscious attribution of particular qualities to a member of a certain social group.

Implicit stereotypes are shaped by experience and based on learned associations between particular qualities and social categories, including race and/or gender. Individuals' perceptions and behaviors can be influenced by the implicit stereotypes they hold, even if they are unaware/unintentionally hold such stereotypes. Implicit bias is an aspect of implicit social cognition: the phenomenon that perceptions, attitudes, and stereotypes operate without conscious intention. For example, researchers may have implicit bias when designing survey questions and as a result, the questions do not produce accurate results or fail to encourage survey participation. The existence of implicit bias is supported by a variety of scientific articles in psychological literature. Implicit stereotype was first defined by psychologists Mahzarin Banaji and Anthony Greenwald in 1995.

== See also ==
- Algorithmic bias
- List of cognitive biases
- Detection theory
- Evidence
- Falsity
- Impartiality
- Metascience
- Opinion
- Personal equation
- Political bias
- Prejudice
- Proof (truth)
- Scholarly method
- Source criticism
- Wikipedia:
  - Racial bias on Wikipedia
  - Systemic bias in Wikipedia
  - Ideological bias on Wikipedia
  - Gender bias on Wikipedia
