= Corruption in the Gambia =

Corruption in The Gambia is a complex struggle that is characterized by both a history of entrenched practices and evolving reform initiatives. These are evident in the succession of leadership beginning with Dawda Jawara, who is regarded as the father of his nation. His successor, Yahya Jammeh entrenched corruption within state institutions. Since 2017, Adama Barrow's administration has undertaken visible efforts to dismantle the systems of corruption.

== History ==
Since The Gambia gained its independence in 1965 it has produced three presidents; two of these have been cited for their contributions to a legacy of corruption deeply entrenched in state institutions. The first is Dawda Jawara, who is noted for leading his country to independence. Despite being credited for his commitment to human rights, democracy, and the rule of law, Jawara battled accusations of corruption. Particularly, his administration was criticized for its practice of nepotism and favoritism. These undermined state institutions as installed civil servants and public officials engaged in corrupt practices such as the embezzlement of funds to maintain their positions.

Jawara was blamed for his inability to address corruption. By the 1970s, for instance, corruption became widespread due to an increase in opportunities for corrupt practices during the public sector expansion under the First Five-Year Plan for Economic and Social Development. Although Jawara publicly condemned corruption and some officials were implicated, a lack of consistent prosecution and punishment fostered an environment of impunity. After five re-elections, Jawara was ultimately ousted in a 1994 military coup, ending his long tenure and paving the way for Yahya Jammeh's dictatorial regime, which would eventually surpass Jawara's era in scale and severity of corruption.

Jammeh ruled The Gambia through a dictatorship notorious for its human rights abuses such as forced disappearances, extrajudicial killings, and arbitrary detentions. The regime fostered a climate of fear, suppressed dissent, and legislated measures to undermine the judiciary. These collectively created a culture of corruption perpetrated by Jammeh and his cronies. His appointees to prominent positions of state institutions enabled him to loot money from their respective offices. Reports revealed that the cash that were not withdrawn were diverted to bank Jammeh’s bank accounts (including fake accounts created in the central bank), his officials, businesses that received lucrative contracts from the government, and foreign shell companies.

After he was toppled and exiled, a truth and reconciliation commission was created to investigate allegations of rights abuses. It uncovered the extent of corruption and brutality committed during Jammeh’s 22-year-long rule. After nearly two years of investigation, it was revealed that he stole nearly $362 million from the state coffers. An investigative report by the Organized Crime and Corruption Reporting Project (OCCRP) placed the amount of looted money to nearly $1 billion. Details within the commission’s report included the theft of 281 landed properties in The Gambia and ownership of overseas assets such as a residence in the United States. The commission identified Jammeh’s assets in Kanilai, the dictator’s home village, were worth at least $28.2 million. He also owned luxury vehicles, including planes and a fleet of Rolls Royce with his name embroidered into the headrests. Jammeh was said to have stolen money from the central bank, the national telecommunications agency, and other state institutions.

Jammeh’s fear of rebellion prompted him to favor the Jola tribe. Although, it constituted a minority of the Gambian population, members of this tribe exerted total control over life and politics during the military rule. Members of the Jola tribe were appointed to positions of significant authority that wielded unprecedented power and engaged in corrupt practices within a system characterized by a culture of impunity. Jammeh’s has dismissed the charges of corruption against him as mere witch-hunt

After his predecessor fled The Gambia, Adama Barrow became president in 2017. He was initially seen as a reformer, leading his country towards democratic reform and transparency. Key measures were instituted such as the creation of transitional justice mechanisms and the passage of the Access to Information Bill. In 2020, the country scored 37 out of 100 on Transparency International’s Corruption Perception Index, a significant improvement to the 26 out of 100 rating posted in 2016.

Corruption, however, still persists under Barrow’s regime. This is evident in the case of scandals such as The Gambia’s COVID-19 response, where millions of funds disappeared or misappropriated. It was reported that out of the $10 million emergency fund allocated for the pandemic response, only $3 million had been spent and the expenses were dominated by payments to motor vehicles and hotels while treatment and isolation centers were in dilapidated conditions.

== Cultural factors ==
It is said that corruption is also related to a social norm in The Gambia called maslaha. This is a concept related to the common good that prompt the average Gambians to ignore and forgive instances of corruption. Rooted in Islamic jurisprudence that aims to promote the welfare of the community, it is consistently exploited by government officials to legitimize their actions leading to a systemic failure in the ability of the government to institute meaningful anti-corruption reform measures. Corrupt practices are said to be condoned because of this attitude and it drives all transactions, commercial and non-commercial, as long as it involves a service being provided to another party. Another cultural factor that exacerbates corruption and underdevelopment is the concept of extended family system, which creates a system of dependence of the majority on the few.

== Impact ==
The impact of corruption in The Gambia is significant. The country is paying off a debt burden that reached 130 percent of its gross domestic product by 2018. The system coopted by the previous corrupt regimes were also left weakened, contributing to inefficiencies in the delivery of public services. Pervasive corruption still persists. This continue to undermine economic development and deter foreign investment, as businesses are turned off by the high risks associated with corrupt practices when dealing with the government. When millions of dalasis went missing in the Gambia Port Authority during the GPA scandal, the issue was not addressed despite clamor for accountability. Aside from its impact to public health, the inability to address the issue contributed to the erosion of public trust. Another example is the case of the alleged financial mismanagement in the National Water and Electricity Company, which contributes to the worsening energy crisis in the country.

== International rankings ==
In Transparency International's 2025 Corruption Perceptions Index, The Gambia scored 37 on a scale from 0 ("highly corrupt") to 100 ("very clean"). When ranked by score, The Gambia ranked 99th among the 182 countries in the Index, where the country ranked first is perceived to have the most honest public sector. For comparison with regional scores, the best score among sub-Saharan African countries (Note: Angola, Benin, Botswana, Burkina Faso, Burundi, Cameroon, Cape Verde, Central African Republic, Chad, Comoros, Côte d'Ivoire, Democratic Republic of the Congo, Djibouti, Equatorial Guinea, Eritrea, Eswatini, Ethiopia, Gabon, Gambia, Ghana, Guinea, Guinea-Bissau, Kenya, Lesotho, Liberia, Madagascar, Malawi, Mali, Mauritania, Mauritius, Mozambique, Namibia, Niger, Nigeria, Republic of the Congo, Rwanda, Sao Tome and Principe, Senegal, Seychelles, Sierra Leone, Somalia, South Africa, South Sudan, Sudan, Tanzania, Togo, Uganda, Zambia, and Zimbabwe.) was 68, the average was 32 and the worst was 9. For comparison with worldwide scores, the best score was 89 (ranked 1), the average was 42, and the worst was 9 (ranked 181, in a two-way tie).
