= Extrinsic incentives bias =

Cognitive bias

The extrinsic incentives bias is an attributional bias according to which people attribute relatively more to "extrinsic incentives" (such as monetary reward) than to "intrinsic incentives" (such as learning a new skill) when weighing the motives of others rather than themselves.

It is a counter-example to the fundamental attribution error as according to the extrinsic bias others are presumed to have situational motivations while oneself is seen as having dispositional motivations. This is the opposite of what the fundamental attribution error would predict. It also might help to explain some of the backfiring effects that can occur when extrinsic incentives are attached to activities that people are intrinsically motivated to do. The term was first proposed by Chip Heath, citing earlier research by others in management science.

== Example ==
In the simplest experiment Heath reported, MBA students were asked to rank the expected job motivations of Citibank customer service representatives. Their average ratings were as follows:

1. Amount of pay
2. Having job security
3. Quality of fringe benefits
4. Amount of praise from your supervisor
5. Doing something that makes you feel good about yourself
6. Developing skills and abilities
7. Accomplishing something worthwhile
8. Learning new things

Actual customer service representatives rank ordered their own motivations as follows:

1. Developing skills and abilities
2. Accomplishing something worthwhile
3. Learning new things
4. Quality of fringe benefits
5. Having job security
6. Doing something that makes you feel good about yourself
7. Amount of pay
8. Amount of praise from your supervisor

The order of the predicted and actual reported motivations was nearly reversed; in particular, pay was rated first by others but near last for respondents of themselves. Similar effects were observed when MBA students rated managers and their classmates.

== Debiasing ==
Heath suggests trying to infer others' motivations as one would by inferring one's own motivations.
