= Cultural bias =

Interpretation and judgement of phenomena by the standards of one's culture

Cultural bias is the tendency of individuals to interpret and judge others' experiences through the lens of one's own cultural background. It is sometimes considered a problem central to social and human sciences, such as economics, psychology, anthropology, and sociology. Some practitioners of these fields have attempted to develop methods and theories to compensate for or eliminate cultural bias. Cultural bias can be intentional or unintentional, due to the nature of these sciences, drawing conclusions about human behavior can result in unintentional cultural bias.

Cultural bias occurs when people of a culture make assumptions about conventions, including conventions of language, notation, proof and evidence. They are then accused of mistaking these assumptions for laws of logic or nature. Numerous such biases exist, concerning cultural norms for color, mate selection, concepts of justice, linguistic and logical validity, the acceptability of evidence, and taboos.

== Psychology ==
Cultural bias is a phenomenon that gets its presence from differential performance of socioracial (e.g., Blacks, Whites), ethnic (e.g., Latinos/Latinas, Anglos), or national groups (e.g., Americans, Japanese) on measures of psychological constructs such as cognitive abilities, knowledge or skills (CAKS), or symptoms of psychopathology (e.g., depression). Historically, the term grew out of efforts to explain score differences on CAKS tests primarily of African American and Latino/Latina American test takers relative to their White American counterparts and concerns that test scores should not be interpreted in the same manner across those groups in the name of fairness and equality (see also Cognitive dissonance). Although the concept of cultural bias in testing and assessment also pertains to score differences and potential misdiagnoses with respect to a broader range of psychological concepts, particularly in applied psychology and other social and behavioral sciences, this aspect of cultural bias has received less attention in the relevant literature.

Cultural bias in psychological testing refers to the standardized psychological tests that are conducted to determine the level of intelligence among the test-takers. Limitations of such verbal or non-verbal intelligence tests have been observed since their introduction. Many tests have been objected to, as they produced poor results for the ethnic or racial minorities (students), as compared to the racial majorities. There is minimal evidence supporting claims of cultural bias and cross-cultural examination is both possible and done frequently. As discussed above, the learning environment, the questions posed or situations given in the test may be familiar and strange at the same time to students from different backgrounds, the type of ambiguity in which intellectual differences become apparent in individual capacities to resolve the strange-yet-familiar entity.

== Economics ==
Cultural bias in economic exchange is often overlooked. The perception of culture can directly effect commerce. A study done at the Northwestern University suggests that the cultural perception that two countries have of each other plays a large factor in the economic activity between them. The study suggests that low bilateral trust between two countries results in less trade, less portfolio investment, and less direct investment. The effect is amplified for goods, as they are more trust-intensive. A similar study published by the London School of Economics and Political Science found that investors underestimate vastly foreign markets and overestimate companies with culturally similar CEO's. Inversely, banks with culturally diverse management result in less biased views of investment and ultimately more diverse and profitable portfolios.

== Sociology ==
It is thought that societies with conflicting beliefs will more likely have cultural bias, as it is dependent on the group's standing in society in which the social constructions affect how a problem is produced. One example of cultural bias within the context of sociology can be seen in a study done at the University of California by Jane R. Mercer of how test "validity", "bias", and "fairness" in different cultural belief systems affect one's future in a pluralistic society. A definition of the cultural bias was given as "the extent that the test contains cultural content that is generally peculiar to the members of one group but not to the members of another group", which leads to a belief that "the internal structure of the test will differ for different cultural groups". In addition, the different types of errors made on culture-biased tests are dependent on different cultural groups. The idea progressed to the conclusion that a non-cultural-test represents the ability of a population as intended and not the abilities of a group that is not represented.

== History ==
History, as a narrative, indicates cultural bias. Stories that are passed down from generation to generation and are notoriously different based on the narrator is a prime example of cultural bias at play. Historical accounts are shaped by the surroundings, biases, and perceptions of those who interpret and retell them. For example, the narrative of Settlers "discovering" new land in the Americas and creating "civilization" were only ever historically accurate to those who learned from European ancestors. Native American descendants had different accounts, but up until recent years the former was utterly true to most of the general population. Cultural bias may also arise in historical scholarship when the standards, assumptions and conventions of the historian's own era are anachronistically used to report and to assess events of the past. The tendency is sometimes known as presentism, and is regarded by many historians as a fault to be avoided. Arthur Marwick has argued that "a grasp of the fact that past societies are very different from our own, and... very difficult to get to know" is an essential and fundamental skill of the professional historian; and that "anachronism is still one of the most obvious faults when the unqualified (those expert in other disciplines, perhaps) attempt to do history."

== See also ==
- Cognitive bias
- Confirmation bias
- Cultural pluralism
- Determinism
- Embodied philosophy
- Environmental racism
- Ethnocentrism
- Framing (social sciences)
- Goodness and value theory
- Observer-expectancy effect
- Out-group homogeneity
- Social Darwinism
- Social learning theory
- Theory-ladenness
- Ultimate attribution error
- Xenocentrism

== Bibliography ==
- Afolabi, Olusegun Emmanuel (2014). Test and Measurement: bias and cultural diversity in psychological assessment. Grin Verlag. ISBN 978-3656588085.
- Boholm, Åsa (1996). "Risk perception and social anthropology: Critique of cultural theory". Ethnos. 61 (1–2): 64–84. doi:10.1080/00141844.1996.9981528.
- Douglas, Mary (1982). "Cultural bias". In the Active Voice. London: Routledge. ISBN 978-0710090652. OCLC 7948115.
- Gilstein, Julia. “Cultural Bias: Research Starters: EBSCO Research.” EBSCO, 2023, www.ebsco.com/research-starters/social-sciences-and-humanities/cultural-bias.
- Flanagan, Cara (2004). Psychology: the ultimate study guide. London: Letts Educational. ISBN 9781843154785.
- Guiso, Luigi; Sapienza, Paola; Zingales, Luigi (2009). "Cultural Biases in Economic Exchange?" (PDF). Quarterly Journal of Economics. 124 (3): 1095–1131. doi:10.1162/qjec.2009.124.3.1095. hdl:1814/7496.
- Helms, Janet E. (30 January 2010). "Cultural Bias in Psychological Testing". In Weiner, I. B.; Craighead, W. E. (eds.). The Corsini Encyclopedia of Psychology. Wiley Online Library. pp. 1–3. doi:10.1002/9780470479216.corpsy0244. ISBN 9780470479216.
- Saka, Orkun. “Do Cultural Biases Spread and Affect Bank Lending to Governments?” The London School of Economics and Political Science, 24 Jan. 2023, www.lse.ac.uk/research/research-for-the-world/economics/cultural-stereotypes-of-multinational-banks-how-cultural-biases-spread-and-affect-bank-lending-to-governments.
- Seidner, Stanley S. (1982). Ethnicity, Language, and Power from a Psycholinguistic Perspective. Brussels: Centre de Recherche sur le Plurilinguisme. OCLC 51685367. Archived from the original on 2016-12-08.
- Spielberger, Charles Donald, ed. (2004). Encyclopedia of Applied Psychology. Elsevier Academic Press. ISBN 978-0126574104.
- Stevenson, Andrew (2010). Cultural Issues in Psychology: a student's handbook. London: Routledge. ISBN 9780415429221.
