= Trait ascription bias =

Psychological tendency

Trait ascription bias is the tendency for people to view themselves as relatively variable in terms of personality, behavior and mood while viewing others as much more predictable in their personal traits across different situations.

== Overview ==
Trait ascription and the cognitive bias associated with it have been a topic of active research for more than three decades. Like many other cognitive biases, trait ascription bias is supported by a substantial body of experimental research and has been explained in terms of numerous theoretical frameworks originating in various disciplines. Among these frameworks are attribution theory (related to how people determine causes of observed events), theories of personality description such as the five factor model, and work regarding the circumstances under which personality assessments are valid. Seminal work includes Turner, Jones, Kammer, and Funder. Incorrectly ascribing traits to other persons based on limited information or observations intuitively plays a role in the formation and perpetuation of some social phenomena such as stereotypes and prejudice. As such, methods to mitigate the effect of trait ascription bias on personality assessments outside of the lab are also of interest to social scientists. Although trait-oriented theories of personality description, and indeed the very notion of universal, enduring traits themselves, have a natural appeal, some researchers are critical of their existence outside of the laboratory and present results which imply trait ascription, and consequently trait ascription bias, are simply residue of the methodologies historically used to "detect" them. Criticism is based either on the non-existence of personality traits (contrary to five factor descriptions), or suggest divergent interpretations of results and alternative mechanisms of ascription, limiting the scope of existing work.

=== The actor and the observer ===
Jones and Nisbett were among the first to argue that people are biased in how they tend to ascribe traits and dispositions to others that they would not ascribe to themselves. Motivated by the classic example of the student explaining poor performance to a supervisor (in which the supervisor might superficially believe the student's explanations but really thinks the performance is due to "enduring qualities": lack of ability, laziness, ineptitude, etc.) their actor–observer asymmetry argument forms the basis of discourse on trait ascription bias.

=== Kammer et al. ===
In a 1982 study involving fifty-six undergraduate psychology students from the University of Bielefeld, Kammer et al. demonstrated that subjects rated their own variability on each of 20 trait terms to be considerably higher than their peers. Building on the earlier work of Jones and Nisbett, which suggests people describe the behaviour of others in terms of fixed dispositions while viewing their own behaviour as the dynamic product of complex situational factors, Kammer hypothesized that one's own behaviours are judged to be less consistent (i.e. not as predictable) but of higher intensities (with regard to particular traits) than the behaviour of others. The experiment had each student describe themselves as well as a same-sex friend using two identical lists of trait-descriptive terms. For example, for the trait of dominance the student was first asked "In general, how dominant are you?" and then "How much do you vary from one situation to another in how dominant you are?" Kammer's results strongly supported his hypothesis.

=== The "trait" of ascribing traits ===
David C. Funder's work on the "trait" of ascribing personality traits investigates the psychology of individuals who tend not to grant others the variability (i.e. lack of predictability) they grant themselves, instead preferring to ascribe traits and infer dispositional explanations of behaviour. It had been generally established that people ascribe more traits to others than to themselves, known as the actor–observer asymmetry in attribution, but Funder's hypothesis was that some individuals are more inclined to make dispositional trait attributions than others, regardless of who they are describing. In the experiment, sixty-three undergraduates filled out a series of questionnaires which asked them to describe themselves, their best friend, and an acquaintance. For each of twenty pairs of polar opposite trait terms (e.g. "friendly—unfriendly") subjects either ranked the person on a discrete scale or chose "depends on the situation", allowing the subject to "not make a dispositional ascription." Based on third-party Q-Sort personality descriptions of the subjects, certain negative personality traits were correlated with those subjects who tended to ascribe dispositions to others, while traits such as "charming", "interesting", and "sympathetic" were associated with those who preferred not to ascribe traits. This result is consistent with the type of personality commonly associated with promoting stereotypes and prejudice.

== Theoretical basis ==
While trait ascription bias has been described by empirical results from various disciplines, most notably psychology and social psychology, explaining the mechanism of the bias remains a contentious issue in the theory of personality description literature.

=== The availability heuristic ===
Tversky and Kahneman describe a cognitive heuristic that suggests people make judgments (including about other people's personalities) on the basis of how easily examples of their (other people's) behaviour come to mind. This would appear to be consistent with the arguments of Jones and Nisbett and the results observed by others.

=== Attribution theory ===
Attribution plays a role in how people understand and judge the causes of the behaviour of others, which in turn affects how they ascribe traits to others. Attributional theory is concerned with how people subsequently judge behavioural causes, which also bears relevance to trait ascription and related biases. In particular, attribution (and attributional) theory can help explain the mechanism by which individuals defer to ascribing dispositional traits vs. situational variability to observers.

== Mitigation ==
Trait ascription bias, regardless of the theoretical mechanisms underpinning it, intuitively plays a role in various social phenomenon observed in the wild. Stereotyping, attitudes of prejudice and the negativity effect, among others, involve ascribing dispositions (traits) to other people on the basis of little information, no information or simply "gut instincts", which amounts to trait ascription bias. As such, some researchers are interested in mitigating cognitive biases to reduce their effects on society.

== Criticism ==
Trait ascription bias has received criticism on a number of fronts. In particular, some have argued that trait ascription, and the notion of traits, are merely artefacts of methodology and that results contrary to conventional wisdom can be achieved with simple changes to the experimental designs used.

== See also ==
- Attribution (psychology)
- Attribution theory
- Availability heuristic
- Bounded rationality
- Cognitive bias
- Forer effect
- Fundamental attribution error
- Illusion of asymmetric insight
- Illusory superiority
- Introspection illusion
- List of biases in judgment and decision making
- Naive cynicism
- Prospect theory
- Stereotyping
- Ultimate attribution error
