= Group attribution error =

Cognitive bias

The group attribution error refers to people's tendency to believe either

1. the characteristics of an individual group member are reflective of the group as a whole, or
2. a group's decision outcome must reflect the preferences of individual group members, even when external information is available suggesting otherwise.

The group attribution error shares an attribution bias analogous to the fundamental attribution error. Rather than focusing on individual's behavior, it relies on group outcomes and attitudes as its main basis for conclusions.

== Typology ==
=== Type I ===
To demonstrate the first form of group attribution error, research participants are typically given case studies about individuals who are members of defined groups (such as members of a particular occupation, nationality, or ethnicity), and then take surveys to determine their views of the groups as a whole. Often the participants may be broken up into separate test groups, some of which are given statistics about the group that directly contradict what they were presented in the case study. Others may even be told directly that the individual in the case study was atypical for the group as a whole. Researchers use the surveys to determine to what extent the participants allowed their views of the individual in the case study to influence their views of the group as a whole and also take note of how effective the statistics were in deterring this group attribution error. Ruth Hamill, Richard E. Nisbett, and Timothy DeCamp Wilson were the first to study this form of group attribution error in detail in their 1980 paper Insensitivity to Sample Bias: Generalizing From Atypical Cases. In their study, the researchers provided participants with a case study about an individual welfare recipient. Half of the participants were given statistics showing that the individual was typical for a welfare recipient and had been on the program for the typical amount of time, while the other half of participants were given statistics showing that the welfare recipient had been on the program much longer than normal. The results of the study revealed that participants did indeed draw extremely negative opinions of all welfare recipients as a result of the case study. It was also found that the differences in statistics provided to the two groups had trivial to no effect on the level of group attribution error.

=== Type II ===
The second form of group attribution error was first reported by Scott T. Allison and David Messick in 1985. This form describes people's tendency to assume incorrectly that group decisions reflect group members' attitudes. In their study the researchers did multiple experiments presenting participants with group decisions made on the national, state, and local levels. Participants were presented with situations in which a matter of public policy was determined by a single leader with no popular vote, a popular vote of over 90% of the population, and a popular vote which included approximately 50% of the population. If no group attribution error were present, the participants would be expected to conclude that in the 90% vote the views of the individuals were reflective of the group decision, in the 50% vote they may or may not be, and in the leader decision there is no evidence that the individual views reflect the group outcome. Allison and Messick discovered instead, however, that the participants associated the individual views with the group outcome in all three cases.

==== Limitations and threats ====
Follow-up research by Leila Worth and Scott T. Allison attempted to identify the limits of the effect. These studies have shown that the error becomes stronger in perceptions of groups that are viewed as (a) more dissimilar to one's own group, (b) more monolithic, and (c) adversarial to one's own group. The error tends to disappear in perceptions of one's own group. Group members are more likely to attribute the decisions of their own group to structural constraints placed on the group, such as its decision rules, whereas members tend to attribute the decisions of another group to its members' attitudes.

In 2001, Corneille et al. conducted further studies that suggest that threatening groups are viewed as being both more extreme and more homogeneous.

== Etymology ==
The group attribution error has been referred as a term since 1985 by Scott T. Allison and David M. Messick after evaluating numerous researches made between 1970 and 1985. These researches tie different attribution biases to an individual either 1) the individual's behavior or 2) the outcomes of the group that the individual belongs to. The first one is known as the fundamental attribution error, and the consequent one is known as the group attribution error.

== Human development perception of group attribution ==
Infants develop the ability to categorize first by putting a gender label to other children. Then, the difference in color of the skin begins to play a role in their ability to distinguish different backgrounds. Consequently, group attribution biases towards members of different groups, either on race or gender, affect their ability to judge others. For example, the conception of children believing that "all boys are abusive" illustrates the influence of categorization and generalization to members of this group (boys).

== Connections to different attribution errors ==
The fundamental attribution error is similar to the group attribution error in that it refers to the tendency to believe that an individual's actions are representative of the individual's preferences, even when available information suggests that the actions were caused by outside forces.

The group attribution error and the ultimate attribution error share the individual's tendency to draw different prejudiced conclusions between in-groups and out-groups. The individuals involved in an in-group would attribute positive conclusions about their group outcomes, yet they would attribute negative conclusions towards the out-group members.

== See also ==
- Attribution bias
- Attribution theory
- Fundamental attribution error
- Ingroup bias
- List of cognitive biases
- Outgroup homogeneity bias
- Outcome bias
- Ultimate attribution error
