= Attribution bias =

Systematic errors made when people evaluate their own and others' behaviors

In psychology, an attribution bias or attributional errors is a cognitive bias that refers to the systematic errors made when people evaluate or try to find reasons for their own and others' behaviors. It refers to the systematic patterns of deviation from norm or rationality in judgment, often leading to perceptual distortions, inaccurate assessments, or illogical interpretations of events and behaviors.

Attributions are the judgments and assumptions people make about why others behave a certain way. However, these judgments may not always reflect the true situation. Instead of being completely objective, people often make errors in perception that lead to skewed interpretations of social situations. Attribution biases are present in everyday life. For example, when a driver cuts someone off, the person who has been cut off is often more likely to attribute blame to the reckless driver's inherent personality traits (e.g., "That driver is rude and incompetent") rather than situational circumstances (e.g., "That driver may have been late to work and was not paying attention").

Additionally, there are many different types of attribution biases, such as the ultimate attribution error, fundamental attribution error, actor-observer bias, and hostile attribution bias. Each of these biases describes a specific tendency that people exhibit when reasoning about the cause of different behaviors.

This field of study helps to understand how people make sense of their own and others' actions. It also shows us how our preconceptions and mental shortcuts can impact our decision-making. Researchers have examined these biases and explored how they influence emotions and actions.

== History ==
=== Early influences ===
==== Attribution theory ====
Research on attribution biases is founded in attribution theory, which was proposed to explain why and how people create meaning about others' and their own behavior. This theory focuses on identifying how an observer uses information in his/her social environment in order to create a causal explanation for events. Attribution theory also provides explanations for why different people can interpret the same event in different ways and what factors contribute to attribution biases.

Psychologist Fritz Heider first discussed attributions in his 1958 book, The Psychology of Interpersonal Relations. Heider made several contributions that laid the foundation for further research on attribution theory and attribution biases. He noted that people tend to make distinctions between behaviors that are caused by personal disposition versus environmental or situational conditions. He also predicted that people are more likely to explain others' behavior in terms of dispositional factors (i.e., caused by a given person's personality), while ignoring the surrounding situational demands.

==== Correspondent inference theory ====
Building on Heider's early work, other psychologists in the 1960s and 1970s extended work on attributions by offering additional related theories. In 1965, social psychologists Edward E. Jones and Keith Davis proposed an explanation for patterns of attribution termed correspondent inference theory. A correspondent inference assumes that a person's behavior reflects a stable disposition or personality characteristic instead of a situational factor. They explained that certain conditions make us more likely to make a correspondent inference about someone's behavior:

- Intention: People are more likely to make a correspondent inference when they interpret someone's behavior as intentional, rather than unintentional.
- Social desirability: People are more likely to make a correspondent inference when an actor's behavior is socially undesirable than when it is conventional.
- Effects of behavior: People are more likely to make a correspondent, or dispositional, inference when someone else's actions yield outcomes that are rare or not yielded by other actions.

==== Covariation model ====
Soon after Jones and Davis first proposed their correspondent inference theory, Harold Kelley, a social psychologist famous for his work on interdependence theory as well as attribution theory, proposed a covariation model in 1973 to explain the way people make attributions. This model helped to explain how people choose to attribute a behavior to an internal disposition versus an environmental factor. Kelley used the term 'covariation' to convey that when making attributions, people have access to information from many observations, across different situations, and at many time points; therefore, people can observe the way a behavior varies under these different conditions and draw conclusions based on that context. He proposed three factors that influence the way individuals explain behavior:

- Consensus: The extent to which other people behave in the same way. There is high consensus when most people behave consistent with a given action/actor. Low consensus is when not many people behave in this way.
- Consistency: The extent to which a person usually behaves in a given way. There is high consistency when a person almost always behaves in a specific way. Low consistency is when a person almost never behaves like this.
- Distinctiveness: The extent to which an actor's behavior in one situation is different from his/her behavior in other situations. There is high distinctiveness when an actor does not behave this way in most situations. Low distinctiveness is when an actor usually behaves in a particular way in most situations.

Kelley proposed that people are more likely to make dispositional attributions when consensus is low (most other people do not behave in the same way), consistency is high (a person behaves this way across most situations), and distinctiveness is low (a person's behavior is not unique to this situation). Alternatively, situational attributions are more likely reached when consensus is high, consistency is low, and distinctiveness is high. His research helped to reveal the specific mechanisms underlying the process of making attributions.

=== Later development ===
As early researchers explored the way people make causal attributions, they also recognized that attributions do not necessarily reflect reality and can be colored by a person's own perspective. Certain conditions can prompt people to exhibit attribution bias, or draw inaccurate conclusions about the cause of a given behavior or outcome. In his work on attribution theory, Fritz Heider noted that in ambiguous situations, people make attributions based on their own wants and needs, which are therefore often skewed. He also explained that this tendency was rooted in a need to maintain a positive self-concept, later termed the self-serving bias.

Kelley's covariation model also led to the acknowledgment of attribution biases. The model explained the conditions under which people will make informed dispositional versus situational attributions. But, it assumed that people had access to such information (i.e., the consensus, consistency, and distinctiveness of a person's behavior). When one does not have access to such information, like when they interact with a stranger, it will result in a tendency to take cognitive shortcuts, resulting in different types of attribution biases, such as the actor-observer bias.

==== Cognitive explanation ====
Although psychologists agreed that people are prone to these cognitive biases, there existed disagreement concerning the cause of such biases. On one hand, supporters of a "cognitive model" argued that biases were a product of human information processing constraints. One major proponent of this view was Yale psychologist Michael Storms, who proposed this cognitive explanation following his 1973 study of social perception. In his experiment, participants viewed a conversation between two individuals, dubbed Actor One and Actor Two. Some participants viewed the conversation while facing Actor One, such that they were unable to see the front of Actor Two, while other participants viewed the conversation while facing Actor Two, obstructed from the front of Actor One.

Following the conversation, participants were asked to make attributions about the conversationalists. Storms found that participants ascribed more causal influence to the person they were looking at. Thus, participants made different attributions about people depending on the information they had access to. Storms used these results to bolster his theory of cognitively-driven attribution biases; because people have no access to the world except through their own eyes, they are inevitably constrained and consequently prone to biases. Similarly, social psychologist Anthony Greenwald described humans as possessing a totalitarian ego, meaning that people view the world through their own personal selves. Therefore, different people may interpret the world differently and in turn reach different conclusions.

==== Motivational explanation ====
Some researchers criticized the view that attributional biases are a sole product of information processing constraints, arguing that humans do not passively interpret their world and make attributions; rather, they are active and goal-driven beings. Building on this criticism, research began to focus on the role of motives in driving attribution biases. Researchers such as Ziva Kunda drew attention to the motivated aspects of attributions and attribution biases. Kunda in particular argued that certain biases only appear when people are presented with motivational pressures; therefore, they cannot be exclusively explained by an objective cognitive process. More specifically, people are more likely to construct biased social judgments when they are motivated to arrive at a particular conclusion, so long as they can justify this conclusion.

== Current theory ==
Early researchers explained attribution biases as cognitively driven and a product of information processing errors. In the early 1980s, studies demonstrated that there may also be a motivational component to attribution biases, such that their own desires and emotions affect how one interprets social information. Current research continues to explore the validity of both of these explanations by examining the function of specific types of attribution biases and their behavioral correlates through a variety of methods (e.g., research with children or using brain imaging techniques).

Recent research on attribution biases has focused on identifying specific types of these biases and their effect on people's behavior. Additionally, some psychologists have taken an applied approach and demonstrated how these biases can be understood in real-world contexts (e.g., the workplace or school). Researchers have also used the theoretical framework of attributions and attribution biases in order to modify the way people interpret social information. For example, studies have implemented attributional retraining to help students have more positive perceptions of their own academic abilities (see below for more details).

=== Mental health ===
Studies on attribution bias and mental health suggest that people who have mental illnesses are more likely to hold attribution biases. People who have mental illness tend to have a lower self-esteem, experience social avoidance, and do not commit to improving their overall quality of life, often as a result of lack of motivation. People with these problems tend to feel strongly about their attribution biases and will quickly make their biases known. These problems are called social cognition biases and are even present in those with less severe mental problems. There are many kinds of cognitive biases that affect people in different ways, but all may lead to irrational thinking, judgment, and decision-making.

=== Aggression ===
Extensive research in both social and developmental psychology has examined the relationship between aggressive behavior and attribution biases, with a specific focus on the hostile attribution bias.

In particular, researchers have consistently found that children who exhibit a hostile attribution bias (tendency to perceive others' intent as hostile, as opposed to benign) are more likely to engage in aggressive behaviors. More specifically, hostile attribution bias has been associated with reactive aggression, as opposed to proactive aggression, as well as victimization. Whereas proactive aggression is unprovoked and goal-driven, reactive aggression is an angry, retaliatory response to some sort of perceived provocation. Therefore, children who are victims of aggression may develop views of peers as hostile, leading them to be more likely to engage in retaliatory (or reactive) aggression.

Research has also indicated that children can develop hostile attribution bias by engaging in aggression in the context of a video game. In a 1998 study, participants played either a violent or non-violent video game and were then asked to read several hypothetical stories where a peer's intent was ambiguous. For example, participants may have read about their peer hitting someone in the head with a ball, but it was unclear whether or not the peer did this intentionally. Participants then responded to questions about their peer's intent. The children who played the violent video game were more likely to say that their peer harmed someone on purpose than the participants who played the nonviolent game. This finding provided evidence that exposure to violence and aggression could cause children to develop a short-term hostile attribution bias.

=== Intergroup relations ===
Research has found that humans often exhibit attribution biases when interpreting the behavior of others, and specifically when explaining the behavior of in-group versus out-group members. A review of the literature on intergroup attribution biases noted that people generally favor dispositional explanations of an in-group member's positive behavior and situational explanations for an in-group's negative behavior. Alternatively, people are more likely to do the opposite when explaining the behavior of an out-group member (i.e., attribute positive behavior to situational factors and negative behavior to disposition). Essentially, group members' attributions tend to favor the in-group. This finding has implications for understanding other social psychological topics, such as the development and persistence of out-group stereotypes.

Attribution biases in intergroup relations are observed as early as childhood. In particular, elementary school students are more likely to make dispositional attributions when their friends perform positive behaviors, but situational attributions when disliked peers perform positive behaviors. Similarly, children are more likely to attribute friends' negative behaviors to situational factors, whereas they attribute disliked peers' negative behaviors to dispositional factors. These findings provide evidence that attribution biases emerge very early on.

=== Academic achievement ===
Although certain attribution biases are associated with maladaptive behaviors, such as aggression, some research has also indicated that these biases are flexible and can be altered to produce positive outcomes. Much of this work falls within the domain of improving academic achievement through attributional retraining. For example, one study found that students who were taught to modify their attributions actually performed better on homework assignments and lecture materials. The retraining process specifically targeted students who tended to attribute poor academic performance to external factors. It taught these students that poor performance was often attributable to internal and unstable factors, such as effort and ability. Therefore, the retraining helped students perceive greater control over their own academic success by altering their attributional process.

More recent research has extended these findings and examined the value of attributional retraining for helping students adjust to an unfamiliar and competitive setting. In one study, first year college students went through attributional retraining following their first exam in a two-semester course. Similar to the previous study, they were taught to make more controllable attributions (e.g., "I can improve my test grade by studying more") and less uncontrollable attributions (e.g., "No matter what I do, I'll fail"). For students who performed low or average on their first exam, attributional retraining resulted in higher in-class test grades and GPA in the second semester. Students who performed well on the first exam were found to have more positive emotions in the second semester following attributional retraining. Taken together, these studies provide evidence for the flexibility and modifiability of attributional biases.

== Limitations of the theory ==
There is inconsistency in the claims made by scientists and researchers that attempt to prove or disprove attribution theories and the concept of attributional biases. The theory was formed as a comprehensive explanation of the way people interpret the basis of behaviors in human interactions; however, there have been studies that indicate cultural differences in the attribution biases between people of Eastern, collectivistic societies and Western, individualistic societies. A study done by Thomas Miller shows that when dealing with conflict created by other people, individualistic cultures tend to blame the individual for how people behave (dispositional attributions), whereas collectivist cultures blame the overall situation on how people behave (situational attributions).

These same findings were replicated in a study done by Michael Morris where an American group and a Chinese group were asked their opinions about the killings perpetrated by Gang Lu at the University of Iowa. The American group focused on the killer's own internal problems. The Chinese group focused more on the social conditions surrounding the killing. This reinforces the notion that individualistic and collectivistic cultures tend to focus on different aspects of a situation when making attributions.

Additionally, some scientists believe that attributional biases are only exhibited in certain contexts of interaction, where possible outcomes or expectations make the forming of attributions necessary. These criticisms of the attribution model reveal that the theory may not be a general, universal principle.

== Major attribution biases ==
Researchers have identified many different specific types of attribution biases, all of which describe ways in which people exhibit biased interpretations of information. Note that this is not an exhaustive list (see List of attribution biases for more).

=== Fundamental attribution error ===
The fundamental attribution error refers to a bias in explaining others' behaviors. According to this error, when someone makes attributions about another person's actions, they are likely to overemphasize the role of dispositional factors while minimizing the influence of situational factors. For example, if a person sees a coworker bump into someone on his way to a meeting, that person is more likely to explain this behavior in terms of the coworker's carelessness or hastiness rather than considering that he was running late to a meeting.

This term was first proposed in the early 1970s by psychologist Lee Ross following an experiment he conducted with Edward E. Jones and Victor Harris in 1967. In this study, participants were instructed to read two essays; one expressed pro-Castro views, and the other expressed anti-Castro views. Participants were then asked to report their attitudes towards the writers under two separate conditions. When participants were informed that the writers voluntarily chose their position towards Castro, participants predictably expressed more positive attitudes towards the anti-Castro writer. However, when participants were told that the writers' positions were determined by a coin toss rather than their own free will, participants unpredictably continued to express more positive attitudes towards the anti-Castro writer. These results demonstrated that participants did not take situational factors into account when evaluating a third party, thus providing evidence for the fundamental attribution error.

=== Actor-observer bias ===
The actor-observer bias (also called actor–observer asymmetry) can be thought of as an extension of the fundamental attribution error. According to the actor-observer bias, in addition to over-valuing dispositional explanations of others' behaviors, people tend to under-value dispositional explanations and over-value situational explanations of their own behavior. For example, a student who studies may explain her behavior by referencing situational factors (e.g., "I have an exam coming up"), whereas others will explain her studying by referencing dispositional factors (e.g., "She's ambitious and hard-working"). This bias was first proposed by Edward E. Jones and Richard E. Nisbett in 1971, who explained that "actors tend to attribute the causes of their behavior to stimuli inherent in the situation, while observers tend to attribute behavior to stable dispositions of the actor."

There has been some controversy over the theoretical foundation of the actor-observer bias. In a 2006 meta-analysis of all published studies of the bias since 1971, the author found that Jones' and Nisbett's original explanation did not hold. Whereas Jones and Nisbett proposed that actors and observers explain behaviors as attributions to either dispositions or situational factors, examining past studies revealed that this assumption may be flawed. Rather, the theoretical reformulation posits that the way people explain behavior depends on whether or not it is intentional, among other things. For more information on this theoretical reformulation, see actor-observer asymmetry, or refer to Malle's meta-analysis in #Further reading.

=== Self-serving bias ===
A self-serving bias refers to people's tendency to attribute their successes to internal factors but attribute their failures to external factors. This bias helps to explain why individuals tend to take credit for their own successes while often denying responsibility for failures. For example, a tennis player who wins his match might say, "I won because I'm a good athlete," whereas the loser might say, "I lost because the referee was unfair."

The self-serving bias has been thought of as a means of self-esteem maintenance. A person will feel better about themselves by taking credit for successes and creating external blames for failure. This is further reinforced by research showing that as self-threat increases, people are more likely to exhibit a self-serving bias. For example, participants who received negative feedback on a laboratory task were more likely to attribute their task performance to external, rather than internal, factors. The self-serving bias seems to function as an ego-protection mechanism, helping people to better cope with personal failures.

=== Hostile attribution bias ===
Hostile attribution bias (HAB) has been defined as an interpretive bias wherein individuals exhibit a tendency to interpret others' ambiguous behaviors as hostile, rather than benign. For example, if a child witnesses two other children whispering, they may assume that the children are talking negatively about them. In this case, the child made an attribution of hostile intent, even though the other children's behavior was potentially benign. Research has indicated that there is an association between hostile attribution bias and aggression, such that people who are more likely to interpret someone else's behavior as hostile are also more likely to engage in aggressive behavior. See the previous section on aggression for more details on this association.

== List of attribution biases ==
- Actor–observer asymmetry
- Defensive attribution hypothesis
- Egocentric bias
- False-consensus effect
- Fundamental attribution error
- Group attribution error
- In-group favoritism
- Negativity effect
- Positivity effect
- Psychological projection
- Self-serving bias
- Trait ascription bias
- Ultimate attribution error
- Unrealistic optimism
- Hostile attribution bias

== See also ==
- Theory of mind – Ability to attribute mental states to oneself and others
- Attribution (psychology) – Process by which individuals explain causes of behavior and events
- Fallacy of the single cause – Assumption of a single cause where multiple factors may be necessary
- Causality – How one process influences another
- Cognitive dissonance – Mental phenomenon of holding contradictory beliefs
- Just-world fallacy – Idea that everyone faces consequence as they deserve
- List of cognitive biases
- False consensus effect – Attributional type of cognitive bias
