= Dispositional attribution =

Phrase in personality psychology

In personality psychology, dispositional attribution (or internal attribution or personal attribution) is the tendency to assign responsibility for others' behaviours to their inherent characteristics, such as personality, beliefs, or ability, rather than attributing it to external (situational) influences like environment or culture. More simply, dispositional attribution involves attributing the cause of an event to factors that are perceived to be controlled by an individual. For example, observing a person who performs caring and selfless acts may lead to the dispositional attribution that they are a generous person.

== Early theories ==
Attribution theory was developed by Fritz Heider in 1958, who originally examined the process by which people explain the causes of behaviours and events, and if it was caused by internal factors, such as personality or intentions, or external circumstances, like environmental or situational conditions.

=== Correspondent inference theory ===
Dispositional, also known as internal, attribution connects our motives and behaviour. Jones and Davis were early researchers that hypothesized the relationship between the two, where they specifically observed the meanings behind intentional behaviour, rather than automatic or situational behaviour. Jones and Davis's Correspondent Inference Theory (1965) outlines the five sources of information we use to distinguish intentionality to make dispositional attributions.

Choice, having the opportunity and willingness to choose one's behaviour can show internal attributions. Accidental vs. Intentional behaviour, intentional actions are more commonly related to a person's character or personality, while accidental actions are typically attributed to situational or external contexts. Social desirability, dispositional behaviours are more likely a result of actions that deviate from social norms, or lower social desirability. For example, observing someone sitting on the floor of a bus instead of a seat, may lead to inferences that the person's personality drives their unusual choice. Hedonistic relevance, if someone's behaviour is directly aimed at helping or harming us, it is likely to be assumed as intentional. The perceived relevance determines whether the actions are attributed to internal motives. Lastly, personalism, if an individual's behaviour is intended to specifically impact us, it is interpreted as personal and deliberate.

=== Kelley's covariation model ===
Developed by Harold Kelley in 1967, the covariation model is a well recognized attribution theory. It provides a structured approach in determining whether actions arise from dispositional or situational factors. This model emphasizes the use of several observations across different times and situations to identify patterns. Covariation reflects the process of examining how behaviour is consistently associated with particular causes, allowing people to infer if their actions stem from the person, the situation, or both.

The key components of this model are three factors: consensus, distinctiveness, and consistency, which are used to determine whether behaviour is attributed to internal or external causes. Consensus refers to the extent to which other individuals behave similarly in the same situation. Behaviour is considered high in consensus when many people respond in the same way, and low in consensus when they do not. Distinctiveness reflects whether a person behaves differently across various situations; behaviour that occurs only in specific contexts is considered high in distinctiveness, while behaviour that occurs across many contexts is low in distinctiveness. Consistency refers to whether a person behaves the same way over time in similar situations, with repeated patterns indicating high consistency and irregular patterns indicating low consistency.

== Related biases ==
Dispositional attribution is closely related to key biases in attribution theory.

- Self-serving bias are interconnected with dispositional attribution as one is inclined to attribute good things they do to their own personality. We tend to make dispositional attribution for our own positive behaviours and external attributions for our negative behaviours.
- Dispositional attribution is related to the Fundamental attribution error which explains how individuals make distorted or incorrect attributions. Fundamental attribution error emphasizes how people tend to overly attribute peoples behaviour to dispositional factors.
- Dispositional attribution is similarly related to the actor-observer bias. According to the actor-observer bias, dispositional attribution is most likely for others, well situational attribution is more likely for the self.
- The confirmation bias is relevant as influences how individuals perceive and process information about others therefore affecting the attribution process. Confirmation bias can reinforce dispositional attribution as it can lead people to selectively focus on evidence that aligns with their pre-existing beliefs about someone's disposition or personality.

== Culture and attribution ==
Culture is a contributing factor to the strength and extent of dispositional attribution. Studies have found that dispositional attribution is more prominent in Western culture. One such study found that while Americans focus on a central focal object, Asians are able to observe more contextual factors, even when it comes to a visual display where no attribution is inherent, highlighting how Asians are less likely to form dispositional attributions. Another study found that Indian participants were more likely to consider context when making attributions about behaviour, while American participants had a tendency to use dispositional attribution and disregard contextual factors. Furthermore, contemporary research has proposed a new attributional dimension inspired by Chinese philosophy: human- versus heaven-determined. This refers to whether perceived causes are attributed to powers such as heaven, God, and fate (heaven-determined attribution) or determined by people (human-determined attribution). Research using this perspective indicates that cultural groups differ not only in their use of dispositional and situational attributions, but also in the attributional dimensions that are examined.

=== Linguistic category model ===
Variation in dispositional attribution is also tied to cross-cultural language differences. Established by Semin & Fiedler in 1988, the Linguistic Category Model outlines how language plays a role in systematic cognitive inferences, particularly when it comes to attributions and intergroup relations. This model outlines that while using verbs to describe a person's behaviour is more common in Asian cultures and is tied to situational attribution (eg. "Harry helps Serena"), Europeans typically use more adjectives to make overall statements about the disposition of a person (eg. "Harry is a helpful person"). In line with this, Easterners tend to turn adjectives into verbs unconsciously, while Westerners will turn verbs into adjectives, displaying automatic dispositional attribution.

== Applications ==
Research applying dispositional attribution has been conducted across several domains, including but not limited to, health and education. In these areas, attribution shapes judgments about the causes of behaviour, and influences related decisions, expectations, and interventions.

=== Health ===
Dispositional attribution is used in health education through attributional retraining interventions. These programs aim to shift individuals' explanations for health-related failures towards controllable and unstable causes (such as effort or strategy), rather than stable and internal traits (i.e., disposition). This reframing has been applied in areas like smoking cessation, weight management, and general health behaviour change programs. Research shows that when people attribute setbacks to internal, controllable, and unstable factors, they report higher expectations of future success and demonstrate improved performance in health-related tasks.

=== Education ===
Teachers' dispositional attributions play a role in classroom decision-making. When explaining student success or failure, teachers often rely on internal causes, like ability and effort. These attributions influence teacher expectations, willingness to provide assistance, and judgements about student capability. Attributing student difficulties to stable traits like low ability (i.e., disposition), is associated with lower expectations and reduced instructional support, while attributing performance to controllable factors is linked to more supportive teaching responses.

== See also ==
- Attribution bias
- Attribution theory
- Fundamental attribution error
- Nature and nurture
- Stanford prison experiment
