= Interpretive bias =

Interpretive bias or interpretation bias is an information-processing bias, the tendency to inappropriately analyze ambiguous stimuli, scenarios and events. One type of interpretive bias is hostile attribution bias, wherein individuals perceive benign or ambiguous behaviors as hostile. For example, a situation in which one friend walks past another without acknowledgement. The individual may interpret this behavior to mean that their friend is angry with them.

== Psychology ==
It has been hypothesized that individuals with anxiety are more likely to experience interpretive bias. One study considered the interpretation of neutral facial expressions in individuals with high and low social anxiety and found that socially anxious participants perceived neutral faces as negative regardless of the context. In contrast, the study found that non-anxious participants only showed interpretive bias in situations that created anxiety, rather than as a function of their personality. Psychiatry research has also shown that individuals with vulnerability to paranoia have a tendency to develop interpretive bias.

== Homographs ==
Another studied considered how anxiety influenced which meaning of homographs was chosen. Homographs are words with at least two meanings. They found that anxious personalities are more likely to produce threatening interpretations. Another study found that interpretive bias depends on subsequent controlled processes.

== See also ==
- Attributional bias
- Mentalization
