= Ultimate attribution error =

Cognitive bias

Chart describing the ultimate attribution error, with an example

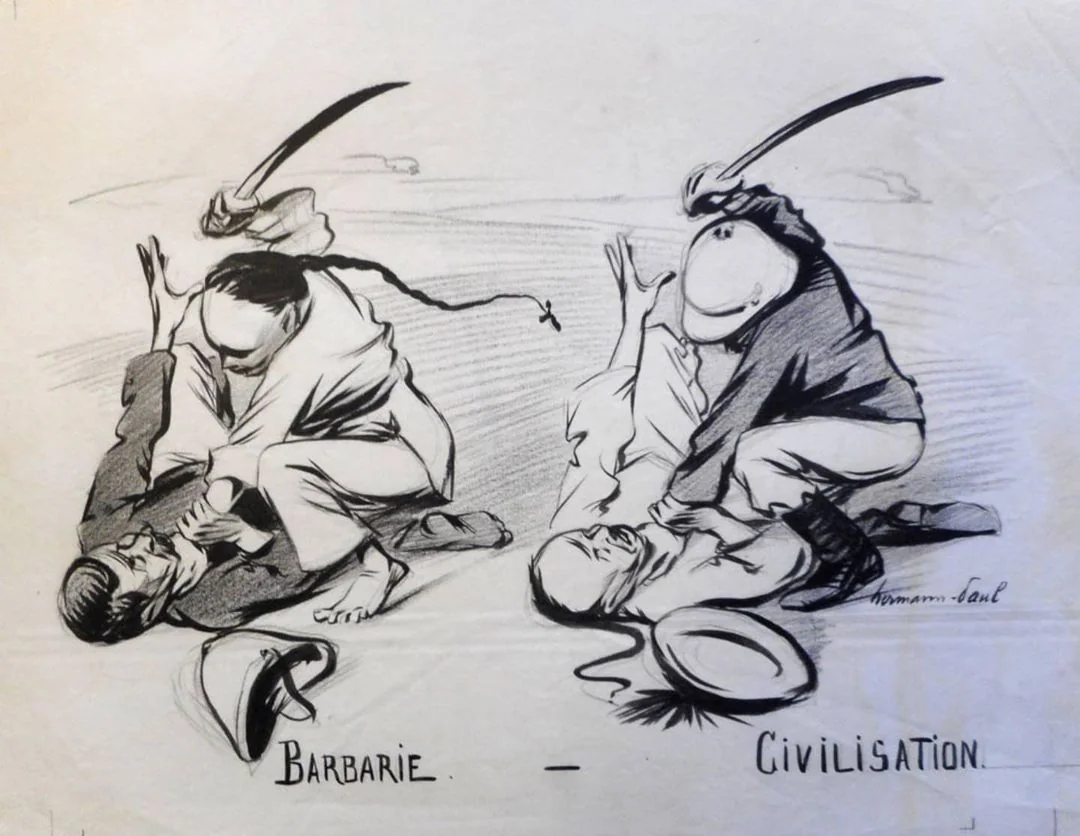
1899 cartoon in the French magazine Le Cri de Paris, commenting on the Boxer Rebellion against foreign influence in China (Hermann-Paul, 1899)

The ultimate attribution error is an attribution error made when making in-group and out-group attributions, resulting in in-group favoritism. The error occurs when attributions of outgroup behavior are more negative and attributions of ingroup behavior are more positive. As a cognitive bias, the error results in negative outgroup behavior being more likely to be attributed to factors internal and specific to the actor, such as personality, and to attribute positive behaviors to external factors, such as the context the behavior is exhibited in. The opposite effect is seen for in-group members as they are more likely to attribute their positive acts to dispositional factors, and their negative acts to situational factors. Also, in-group members will 'explain away' out-group success to external factors such as luck or circumstance. The bias reinforces negative stereotypes and prejudice about the out-group and favouritism of the ingroup through positive stereotypes. The Ultimate attribution error is an example of a cognitive bias that shows cross cultural differences, showing up more strongly for individuals in Western cultures than Eastern Cultures.

Emotion is also known to influence the ultimate attribution error, shaping the way individuals attribute behavior to group members. For instance, emotions such as fear and anger can intensify negative attributions toward out-group members by increasing the likelihood of linking bad out-group behavior to dispositional factors, and good behavior to situational factors. This suggests that emotional states play a role in reinforcing the bias, especially in emotionally charged contexts like politics. Negative emotions may lead individuals to make harsher judgements of out-group members, further solidifying stereotypes and prejudiced beliefs.

Four categories have been identified that describe the negative attribution of positive outgroup behaviour. First, that the outgroup member is an exception to a general rule; second, that the member was lucky or had specific advantages; third, that the member was highly motivated; and lastly that the behaviour as attributable to situational causes.

The concept and term originates in an article by Thomas F. Pettigrew in 1979 as an extension of the fundamental attribution error which was identified in 1958. Since its publication, which at the time lacked a strong empirical basis, there has been some support for the theory. The specific categorisation originally proposed had only some empirical support for broader categories of motivational and cognitive attribution. The bias is related to intergroup attribution bias. The attribution bias can be explained by group schemas. The grouping schema assumes that one will like and trust members of their in-group and dislike and hate are expected reactions to the out-group.

== Cross cultural differences ==
The ultimate attribution error may not be identical across cultures. Research by Markus and Kitayama suggested that those in individualistic cultures with an independent view of the self are more likely to experience the ultimate attribution error.

The study conducted by Markus and Kitayama consisted of American and Indian participants who listened to someone describe a motor vehicle accident. Participants were asked to make attributions about the person who was at fault in the accident. Results found differences between the American and Indian participants. American participants were more likely to make dispositional attributions whereas Indian participants more often made situational attributions. Indian participants seemed to place emphasis on understanding the driver's social role in the situation was extremely important when making these attributions.

The preference for contextual explanations by those in cultures who are more collectivist such as India, demonstrates that the way people form attributions varies across cultures. In collectivist, interdependent cultures, individuals are more likely to place emphasis on the role of relationships when making attributions as it is necessary to consider the social situation that the person they are making attributions about finds themselves in. When considering this, Fundamental attribution error may be more likely to occur in those with an independent sense of self as individualist cultures are less likely to focus on the context and relationships within a situation. Culture can play a role in the occurrence of the Ultimate Attribution Error.

Another study by Mason and Morris found that East Asian cultures, which tend to be more collectivist, are more likely to consider social contexts when making causal attributions, whereas Western cultures focus more on individual dispositions. This difference stem from a deeper cultural orientation towards interdependence in East Asian cultures, where individual are more involved within a broader social network. On the other hand, Western societies often emphasise personal responsibility and autonomy, leading to a stronger tendency towards dispositional attribution. Additionally, language differences may also play a role in shaping attribution. Some languages place a stronger emphasis on contextual markers, which may lead speakers to be more mindful of the situational influences on behaviour.

== Real-world implications ==
While much of the research of the ultimate attribution error focuses on theoretical framework, the bias has significant real-world implications in areas such as criminal justice, politics, and media representation.

=== Criminal justice ===
Legal decisions are influenced by the ultimate attribution error, especially when it comes to racial and ethnic differences in punishment. According to research, defendants from minority groups are more likely to have their crimes attributed to innate dispositional flaws (such as "criminal nature"), while members of the majority group are more inclined to attribute similar crimes to outside influences or particular situations. Minority groups may face harsher sentences and a higher chance of conviction as a result of this bias.

=== Politics ===
The ultimate attribution error has a significant impact on political bias. Political party supporters are more prone to reject failures as the result of unfair opposition, while attributing their party's accomplishments to inherent traits like intelligence, commitment, or ability. Constructive political conversation declines and polarisation is strengthened when political opponents' shortcomings are perceived as evidence of their own inexperience or dishonesty.

=== Media representation ===
The media and entertainment frequently reinforce attribution biases by utilising negative dispositional lenses to depict members of the out-group and situational explanations to justify in-group behaviour. According to research, how crime, immigration, and social unrest are portrayed in the media frequently presents marginalised groups as innately prone to bad behaviour, which fuels prejudice and stereotypes.

== Original theory ==
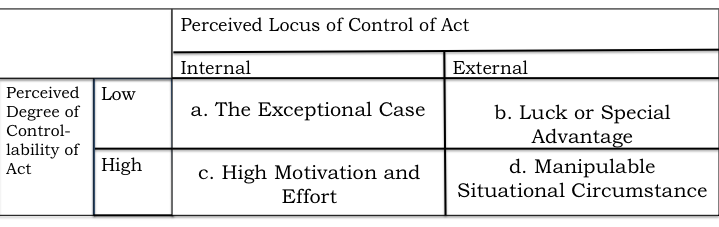
Explaining away positive behavior in outgroup members

In the case of negative attribution of outgroup member's positive behaviours, four categories were proposed. The four categories each correspond to combinations of two factors: perceived degree of controllability of act (low vs high) and perceived locus of control of act (internal vs external).

=== Exceptional case ===
The "exceptional case" explanation is created at the intersection of low controllability of act and internal locus of control. Using this mode of reasoning, an individual excludes the particular outgroup member from the outgroup. That is, they individuate the outgroup member, disassociating them from the group. This view allows for the maintenance of prejudiced beliefs through categorizing the "good" member as an exceptional case, while the other members of their group are still seen as "bad".

=== Luck or special advantage ===
The "luck or special advantage" explanation is created at the intersection of low-perceived controllability of act and external locus of control. This reasoning suggests that the outgroup member's positive behavior is not rooted in their skill, ability, or hard work. Rather, their positive outcome is beyond their immediate control and therefore of little significance. "Special advantage" extends this by suggesting that their group affiliation offers some advantage, and therefore the positive outcome is again of little significance.

=== Highly motivated ===
The "highly motivated" explanation is created at the intersection of high-perceived controllability of act and internal locus of control. Similar to the exceptional case, the highly motivated explanation individuates the outgroup member and dissociates them from their group. The outgroup member's positive behavior is rooted in their drive to be seen as anti-stereotypic, an external force. Thus, they are not seen as intrinsically exceptional, but externally motivated, and, without this motivation, they would not be able to achieve success. That is, an outgroup member's positive behavior is evidence of their response to external pressures of their interaction with ingroup other. Therefore, without an external source of motivation, the outgroup member is just like any other low-achieving, negative-behavior outgroup member.

Similar to the "exceptional case" explanation, this explanation allows for the maintenance of prejudiced beliefs. That is, the highly motivated outgroup member is seen as hard working, so there must be something wrong with the rest of them.

=== Situational ===
The "situational" explanation is created at the intersection of high-perceived controllability of act and external control of the act. An outgroup member's positive outcome is not rooted in their effort or ability, but a result of external situational factors that are, at least in some part, influenced by others. Therefore, their positive behavior is not their own, and is of little consequence.

== History ==
Pettigrew originally published the concept using three prior studies for an empirical basis. One of these was a 1974 study which found results supporting the ultimate attribution error in the causal attributions between religious ingroup and outgroup members. In a 2x2 between-group design, Hindu or Muslim participants were asked to make casual attributions for undesirable acts performed by Hindus or Muslims. Hindus attributed external causes to undesirable acts committed by fellow Hindus, but an internal cause for undesirable acts committed by Muslims. Conversely, Muslims attributed external causes to undesirable acts committed by fellow Muslims, but an internal cause for undesirable acts committed by Hindus. While Pettigrew and many others to follow would focus on race, this study offered clear evidence that similar mechanisms are at play among religious groups.

Another study that was drawn on for Pettigrew's original theory was a 1976 study of ethnocentric behavior. It found that white participants viewed black individuals as more violent than white individuals in an "ambiguous shove" situation, where a black or white person accidentally shoves a white person. In a 2x2 between-group design, white participants viewed a black or white individual (harm-doer) ambiguously shoving a black or white individual (victim). In general, when a black harm-doer shoved another person (whether they were black or white), their behavior was attributed their high dispositional levels of violence (internal). On the other hand, when a white harm-doer shoved another person (whether they were black or white), their behavior was generally attributed to external constraints. The results suggested that the white students participating in the experiment possessed a lower threshold for labeling a behavior as violent when the harm-doer is black (outgroup) than when the harm-doer is white (ingroup).

In 1990, a review of 19 ultimate attribution error studies offered limited support for Pettigrew's ultimate attribution error. Specifically, it found support for three aspects of the ultimate attribution error:

- more internal attribution for positive acts, and less internal attribution for negative acts, by ingroup than outgroup members;
- more attribution of outgroup members' failures to lack of ability, and more explaining away of outgroup members' successes;
- a preference for ingroup-serving versus outgroup-serving attributions for group differences.

== See also ==
- Actor–observer asymmetry
- Cultural bias
- Dispositional attribution
- Group attribution error
