= Closure (sociology) =

Social phenomena

In sociology, closure refers to the phenomenon by which groups maintain their resources by the exclusion of others from their group based on varied criteria. Closure is ubiquitous, being found in groups all over the world at all sizes and classes. Some examples of social closure include, “Access to private schools follows explicit rules and depends on financial capacities; access to university depends on a certificate or diploma, eventually from certain schools only; membership in a highly prestigious club depends on economic and social capital and the respective social networks; and finally, in the case of migration, people will have to be eligible for citizenship and pass the thorny path of naturalization.”

== Mechanisms of social closure ==
=== Blacklisting ===
In employment for example, blacklisting refers to denying people employment for either political reasons (due to actual or suspected political affiliation), due to a history of trade union activity, or due to a history of whistleblowing, for example on safety or corruption issues. Blacklisting may be done by states (denying employment in state entities) as well as by private companies.

=== Segregation ===
School segregation in the United States is considered by social theorist Jeremy Fiel to have been a social closure.

== Theoretical framework ==
=== Frank Parkin's closure theory ===
In sociology, Frank Parkin is best known for his contribution to the theory of social closure, most fully laid out in his Marxism and class theory: A bourgeois critique. In quite sharp tone, Parkin argues that Marxist theories of social class were marked by fundamental deficiencies, particularly associated with the ambiguous status of their central explanatory concept, mode of production. He attacks the Marxists' overemphasis on deep levels of structure, at the expense of social actors, and suggests a radical recasting of the theory of class and stratification. He proposes to do this by centring theory around the concept of social closure. Parkin follows Weber in understanding closure as

the process by which social collectives seek to maximise rewards by restricting access to resources and opportunities to a limited circle of eligibles. This entails the singling out of certain social or physical attributes as the justificatory basis of exclusion. Weber suggests that virtually any group attribute – race, language, social origin, religion- may be seized upon provided it can be used for "the monopolization of specific, usually economic opportunities". This monopolisation is directed against competitors who share some positive or negative characteristic; its purpose is always the closure of social and economic opportunities to outsiders. The nature of these exclusionary practices, and the completeness of social closure, determine the general character of the distributive system.

Parkin goes on to elaborate this concept, by identifying two main types, exclusionary and usurpationary closure. 'The distinguishing feature of exclusionary closure is the attempt by one group to secure for itself a privileged position at the expense of some other group through processes of subordination'. He refers to this metaphorically as the use of power downwards. Usurpationary closure, however, is the use of power upwards, by the groups of subordinates created by the exclusionary closure, aimed at winning a greater share of resources, threatening 'to bite into the privileges of legally defined superiors'.

Arguably, the most novel aspect of Parkin's contribution was that he wanted to define classes in terms of their closure strategies, as opposed to defining class with reference to some structure of positions. The bourgeoisie could be identified, he held, by their reliance on exclusionary closure, as opposed to, say, their ownership of the means of production. Similarly, a subordinate class would be identified by their reliance on usurpationary closure:

the familiar distinction between bourgeoisie and proletariat, in its classic as well as its modern guise, may be conceived of as an expression of conflict between classes defined not specifically in relation to their place in the productive process but in relation to their prevalent modes of closure, exclusion and usurpation, respectively.

== See also ==
- Blacklist (employment)
- Blacklisting
- Caste system
- Discrimination
- Enclosure
- In-group and out-group
- In-group favoritism
- Involuntary unemployment
- Redlining
- Social exclusion
- Social rejection
- Social stigma
- Stereotype content model
