= Out-group homogeneity =

Perception of out-group members as being similar to each other

The out-group homogeneity effect is the perception of out-group members as more similar to one another than are in-group members, i.e. "they are alike; we are diverse". Perceivers tend to have impressions about the diversity or variability of group members around those central tendencies or typical attributes of those group members. Thus, outgroup stereotypicality judgments are overestimated, supporting the view that out-group stereotypes are overgeneralizations. The term "outgroup homogeneity effect", "outgroup homogeneity bias" or "relative outgroup homogeneity" have been explicitly contrasted with "outgroup homogeneity" in general, the latter referring to perceived outgroup variability unrelated to perceptions of the ingroup.

The outgroup homogeneity effect is sometimes referred to as "outgroup homogeneity bias". Such nomenclature hints at a broader meta-theoretical debate that is present in the field of social psychology. This debate centres on the validity of heightened perceptions of ingroup and outgroup homogeneity, where some researchers view the homogeneity effect as an example of cognitive bias and error, while other researchers view the effect as an example of normal and often adaptive social perception. The out-group homogeneity effect has been found using a wide variety of different social groups, from political and racial groups to age and gender groups.

The out-group homogeneity effect is part of a broader field of research that examines perceived group variability. This area includes in-group homogeneity effects as well as out-group homogeneity effects, and it also deals with perceived group variability effects that are not linked to in-group/out-group membership, such as effects that are related to the power, status, and size of groups. The out-group homogeneity effect has been found using a wide variety of different social groups, from political and racial groups to age and gender groups. The implications of this effect on stereotyping have been noted.

== Empirical support ==
An example of this phenomenon comes from a study where researchers asked 90 sorority members to judge the degree of within-group similarity for their own and 2 other groups. It was found that every participant judged their own sorority members to be more dissimilar than the members of the other groups.

=== Racial investigation ===
In an experiment, researchers revealed that people of other races do seem to look more alike than members of one's own race. When white students were shown faces of a few white and a few black individuals, they later more accurately recognized white faces they had seen and often falsely recognized black faces not seen before. The opposite results were found when subjects consisted of black individuals.

== Explanations ==
This bias was found to be unrelated to the number of group and non-group members individuals knew. One might think that people thought members of their own groups were more varied and different simply because they knew them better and thus have more information about ingroups, but this is actually not the case. The out-group homogeneity bias was found between groups such as "men" and "women" who obviously interact frequently.

Elsewhere, this difference is attributed to differences in how people store or process in-group versus out-group information. However, this concept has been challenged due to some cases in which in-groups view themselves as homogeneous. Researchers have postulated that such an effect is present when viewing a group as homogeneous helps to promote in-group solidarity. Experiments on the topic found that in-group homogeneity is displayed when people who highly identify with a group are presented with stereotypical information about that group.

=== Self-categorization theory ===
Self-categorization theory attributes the outgroup homogeneity effect to the differing contexts that are present when perceiving outgroups and ingroups. For outgroups, a perceiver will experience an intergroup context and therefore attend to differences between the two groups. Consequently, less attention is paid to differences between outgroup members and this leads to perceptions of outgroup homogeneity. When perceiving ingroup members a perceiver may experience either an intergroup context or an intragroup context. In an intergroup context the ingroup would also be predicted to be seen as comparatively homogeneous as the perceiver attends to the differences between "us" and "them" (in other words, depersonalization occurs). However, in an intragroup context the perceiver may be motivated to attend to differences with the group (between "me" and "others in the group") leading to perceptions of comparative ingroup heterogeneity. As perceivers are less often motivated to perform intra-group outgroup comparison, this leads to an overall outgroup homogeneity effect.

The self-categorization theory account is supported by evidence showing that in an intergroup context both the ingroup and outgroup will be perceived as more homogenous, while when judged in isolation the ingroup will be perceived as comparatively heterogeneous. The self-categorization theory account eliminates the need to posit differing processing mechanisms for ingroups and outgroups, as well as accounting for findings of outgroup homogeneity in the minimal group paradigm.

=== Social identity theory ===
Another body of research looked at ingroup and outgroup homogeneity from the perspective of social identity theory. While complementary to the self-categorization theory account, this body of research was concerned more with specific homogeneity effects associated with the motivations of perceivers. They derived from social identity theory the prediction that comparative ingroup homogeneity will at times arise due to demands to establish a positive and distinct social identity. For example, members of minority groups would be particularly likely to accentuate intragroup solidity through the emphasis of ingroup homogeneity. This is because minority group members, due to their minority status, are likely to experience threat to their self-esteem. This was empirically supported.

Within the same tradition it was also hypothesised that an ingroup homogeneity effect would emerge on ingroup defining dimensions for both minority and majority group members. This too was empirically supported. Recent research also has reaffirmed that this effect of in-group homogeneity on in-group defining dimensions and out-group homogeneity on out-group defining dimensions may occur because people use their ratings of perceived group variability to express the extent to which social groups possess specific characteristics. Like the self-categorization theory account, this recent research also suggests that the effect may occur independent of the motivational concerns described in social identity theory.

== See also ==
- Common ingroup identity – Model that outlines the processes through which intergroup bias may be reduced
- Cross-race effect – Cognitive bias on facial recognition
- Context-dependent memory – Improved recall when the context of a situation is the same
- Discrimination – Prejudicial treatment based on membership in a certain group
- Group attribution error – Cognitive bias
- In-group favoritism – Psychological bias towards favoring members of one's in-group
- List of biases in judgment and decision making
- Trait ascription bias – Psychological tendency
- Narcissism of small differences – Over-focus on minor social differences
