= Incorrigibility =

Property of a philosophical proposition

In philosophy, incorrigibility is a property of a philosophical proposition, which implies that it is necessarily true simply by virtue of being believed. A common example of such a proposition is René Descartes's "cogito, ergo sum" ('I think, therefore I am').

In law, incorrigibility concerns patterns of repeated or habitual disobedience of minors with respect to their guardians. Laws framed around incorrigibility were formerly used against minors to commit them for longer periods of confinement for status offenses than an adult would have been for committing the same crimes, as contested in the landmark In re Gault decision from 1967.

== Philosophy ==
Charles Raff draws a distinction between three types of incorrigibility:

Type-1
It is logically necessary that, when the statement is sincerely made, it is true.
Type-2
It is necessary that when the statement is believed to be true, it is true.
Type-3
It is necessary that when the statement is true, it is believed to be true.

Type-2 and type-3 incorrigibility are logical converses, and therefore logically independent. Charles Raff argues that introspection is not type-1 incorrigible, but is in fact type-2 and type-3 incorrigible.

Johnathan Harrison has argued that "incorrigible" may be the wrong term, since it seems to imply (by the dictionary definition) a sense that the beliefs cannot be changed, which isn't actually true. In Harrison's view, the incorrigibility of a proposition actually implies something about the nature of believing – for example, that one must exist in order to believe – rather than the nature of the proposition itself.

For illustration, consider Descartes's "Cogito, ergo sum" ('I think, therefore I exist'). Stated in incorrigible form, this could be: "That I believe that I exist implies that my belief is true". Harrison argues that a belief being true is really only incidental to the matter, that really what the cogito proves is that belief implies existence. One could equally well say, "that I believe God exists implies that I exist", or "that I believe I do not exist implies that my belief is false" – and these would have the same essential meaning as the cogito.

=== See also ===
Tinkerbell effect
