= Fundamental attribution error =

Psychological phenomenon

Chart describing the fundamental attribution error, with an example

In social psychology, the fundamental attribution error (Note: Also known as correspondence bias or attribution effect.) is a cognitive attribution bias in which observers underemphasize situational and environmental factors for the behavior of an actor while overemphasizing dispositional or personality factors. In other words, observers tend to overattribute the behaviors of others to their personality (e.g., he is late because he's selfish) and underattribute them to the situation or context (e.g., he is late because he got stuck in traffic). Although personality traits and predispositions are considered to be observable facts in psychology, the fundamental attribution error is an error because it misinterprets their effects.

The group attribution error is identical to the fundamental attribution error, where the bias is shown between members of different groups rather than different individuals.

The ultimate attribution error is a derivative of the fundamental attribution error and group attribution error relating to the actions of groups, with an additional layer of self-justification relating to whether the action of an individual is representative of the wider group.

== Origin ==
=== Etymology ===
The phrase was coined by Lee Ross 10 years after an experiment by Edward E. Jones and Victor Harris in 1967. Ross argued in a popular paper that the fundamental attribution error forms the conceptual bedrock for the field of social psychology. Jones wrote that he found Ross's phrase "overly provocative and somewhat misleading", and also joked: "Furthermore, I'm angry that I didn't think of it first." Some psychologists, including Daniel Gilbert, have used the phrase "correspondence bias" for the fundamental attribution error. Other psychologists have argued that the fundamental attribution error and correspondence bias are related but independent phenomena, with the former being a common explanation for the latter.

=== 1967 demonstration study ===
Jones and Harris hypothesized, based on the correspondent inference theory, that people would attribute apparently freely chosen behaviors to disposition and apparently chance-directed behaviors to situation. The hypothesis was confounded by the fundamental attribution error.

Subjects in an experiment read essays for and against Fidel Castro. Then they were asked to rate the pro-Castro attitudes of the writers. When the subjects believed that the writers freely chose positions for or against Castro, they would normally rate the people who praised Castro as having a more positive attitude towards Castro. However, contradicting Jones and Harris' initial hypothesis, when the subjects were told that the writers' positions were determined by a coin toss, they still rated writers who spoke in favor of Castro as having, on average, a more positive attitude towards Castro than those who spoke against him. In other words, the subjects were unable to properly see the influence of the situational constraints placed upon the writers; they could not refrain from attributing sincere belief to the writers. The experimental group provided more internal attributions towards the writer.

== Criticism ==
The hypothesis that people systematically overattribute behavior to traits (at least for other people's behavior) is contested. A 1986 study tested whether subjects over-, under-, or correctly estimated the empirical correlation among behaviors (i.e., traits, see trait theory). They found that estimates of correlations among behaviors correlated strongly with empirically-observed correlations among these behaviors. Subjects were sensitive to even very small correlations, and their confidence in the association tracked how far they were discrepant (i.e., if they knew when they did not know), and was higher for the strongest relations. Subjects also showed awareness of the effect of aggregation over occasions and used reasonable strategies to arrive at decisions. Epstein concluded that "Far from being inveterate trait believers, as has been previously suggested, [subjects'] intuitions paralleled psychometric principles in several important respects when assessing relations between real-life behaviors."

A 2006 meta-analysis found little support for a related bias, the actor–observer asymmetry, in which people attribute their own behavior more to the environment, but others' behavior to individual attributes. The implications for the fundamental attribution error, the author explained, were mixed. He explained that the fundamental attribution error has two versions:

1. Observers tend to explain an actor's behavior with dispositional rather than environmental explanations;
2. Observers tend to draw conclusions about an actor's stable disposition based on the actor's behavior in a given situation.

The author of the meta-analysis concluded that the existing weight of evidence does not support the first form of the fundamental attribution error, but does not contradict the second.

In 2015, the fundamental attribution error was contested once again in an argument against the measures originally used from the 1967 demonstration study done by Jones and Harris, and the 1982 study done by Quattrone. In this argument, the authors posed that the degree to which behaviour is constrained by a situation is a vital determinant of whether or not a dispositional attribution will be made. Since situations are undeniably complex and are of different "strengths", this will interact with an individual's disposition and determine what kind of attribution is made; although some amount of attribution can consistently be allocated to disposition, the way in which this is balanced with situational attribution will be dependent on the kind of situation one is in and the information available in said situation. The authors analyzing the 2015 study claimed that the results found in the traditional fundamental attribution error studies were "interpreted as biased only because they have been compared to an inappropriate benchmark of rationality predicated on the assumption of deterministic dispositions and situations."

== Explanations ==
Several theories predict the fundamental attribution error, and thus both compete to explain it, and can be falsified if it does not occur.

=== Just-world fallacy ===
The just-world fallacy is the belief that people get what they deserve and deserve what they get, the concept of which was first theorized by Melvin J. Lerner in 1977.

Attributing failures to dispositional causes rather than situational causes—which are unchangeable and uncontrollable—satisfies a need to believe that the world is fair and that people have control over their own lives. People are motivated to see a just world because this reduces their perceived threats, gives them a sense of security, helps them find meaning in difficult and unsettling circumstances, and benefits them psychologically. However, the just-world fallacy also results in a tendency for people to blame and disparage victims of an accident or a tragedy, such as rape and domestic abuse, to reassure themselves of their insusceptibility to such events. People may even blame the victim's faults in a "past life" to pursue justification for their bad outcome.

=== Salience of the actor ===
People tend to attribute observed effects to potential causes that capture their attention. When other people are observed, the person is the primary reference point, while the situation is overlooked. As such, attributions for others' behavior are more likely to focus on the person being seen, not the situational forces acting upon that person that others may not be aware of. (When people observe themselves, they are more aware of the forces acting upon them. Such a differential inward versus outward orientation accounts for the actor–observer bias.) In addition to situational factors being overlooked, when a person is observing a situation in which one individual is specified as the focal point, this typically determines who the observer focuses on more. For instance, when observing a videotape of a crime, if the observer is instructed to focus on the suspect, the suspect's confession may seem more convincing. When the focal point was shifted to the detective however, the people observing the videotape deemed the confession as disingenuous and rehearsed.

=== Lack of effortful adjustment ===
Sometimes, even if one person is aware that another person's behavior is constrained by situational factors, the former still commits the fundamental attribution error because they do not take into account behavioral and situational information simultaneously to characterize the dispositions of the actor. Initially, the observed behavior is used to characterize the person by automaticity. When situational information is not sufficiently taken into account for adjustment, the uncorrected dispositional inference creates the fundamental attribution error. This would also explain why people commit the fundamental attribution error to a greater degree when they are under cognitive load; i.e. when they have less motivation or energy for processing situational information.

=== Culture ===
It has been suggested cultural differences occur in attribution error: people from individualistic (Western) cultures are reportedly more prone to the error while people from collectivistic cultures are less prone. Based on cartoon-figure presentations to Japanese and American subjects, it has been suggested that collectivist subjects may be more influenced by information from context (for instance being influenced more by surrounding faces in judging facial expressions). Alternatively, individualist subjects may favor processing of focal objects, rather than contexts. Others suggest Western individualism is associated with viewing both oneself and others as independent agents, therefore focusing more on individuals rather than contextual details.

Another study found that in contrast to American children emphasizing dispositional factors to explain an event, Hindu children from India were also found to rely more on situational factors. This is due to individualistic cultures normalizing only valuing traits of each person, such as their skills, achievements, unique interests, and more. On the other hand, those in collectivistic cultures view each individual in terms of their social role, viewing them as valuable parts of a group. In these contexts, it is normalized to view decision making in terms of what benefits the larger group and aligns with social norms rather than one's own opinion. Based on these differences, participants in these studies mostly rely on aspects learned by their respective cultures, when making attributions.

== Versus correspondence bias ==
The fundamental attribution error is commonly used interchangeably with "correspondence bias" (sometimes called "correspondence inference"), although this phrase refers to a judgment which does not necessarily constitute a bias, which arises when the inference drawn is incorrect, e.g., dispositional inference when the actual cause is situational. However, there has been debate about whether the two terms should be distinguished from each other. Three main differences between these two judgmental processes have been argued:

1. They seem to be elicited under different circumstances, as both correspondent dispositional inferences and situational inferences can be elicited spontaneously. Attributional processing, however, seems to only occur when the event is unexpected or conflicting with prior expectations. This notion is supported by a 1994 study, which found that different types of verbs invited different inferences and attributions. Correspondence inferences were invited to a greater degree by interpretative action verbs (such as "to help") than state action or state verbs, thus suggesting that the two are produced under different circumstances.
2. Correspondence inferences and causal attributions also differ in automaticity. Inferences can occur spontaneously if the behavior implies a situational or dispositional inference, while causal attributions occur much more slowly.
3. It has also been suggested that correspondence inferences and causal attributions are elicited by different mechanisms. It is generally agreed that correspondence inferences are formed by going through several stages. Firstly, the person must interpret the behavior, and then, if there is enough information to do so, add situational information and revise their inference. They may then further adjust their inferences by taking into account dispositional information as well. Causal attributions however seem to be formed either by processing visual information using perceptual mechanisms, or by activating knowledge structures (e.g. schemas) or by systematic data analysis and processing. Hence, due to the difference in theoretical structures, correspondence inferences are more strongly related to behavioral interpretation than causal attributions.

Based on the preceding differences between causal attribution and correspondence inference, some researchers argue that the fundamental attribution error should be considered as the tendency to make dispositional rather than situational explanations for behavior, whereas the correspondence bias should be considered as the tendency to draw correspondent dispositional inferences from behavior. With such distinct definitions between the two, some cross-cultural studies also found that cultural differences of correspondence bias are not equivalent to those of fundamental attribution error. While the latter has been found to be more prevalent in individualistic cultures than collectivistic cultures, correspondence bias occurs across cultures, suggesting differences between the two phrases. Further, disposition correspondent inferences made to explain the behavior of nonhuman actors (e.g., robots) do not necessarily constitute an attributional error because there is little meaningful distinction between the interior dispositions and observable actions of machine agents.

== See also ==
- Attribution (psychology)
- Base rate fallacy
- Cognitive miser
- Dispositional attribution
- Explanatory style
- Hanlon's razor

=== Cognitive biases ===
- Actor-observer asymmetry
- Attributional bias
- Cognitive bias
- Defensive attribution hypothesis
- False consensus effect
- Group attribution error
- List of cognitive biases
- Locus of control
- Omission bias
- Ultimate attribution error
- Extrinsic incentives bias
