= Defensive attribution hypothesis =

Cognitive bias

The defensive attribution hypothesis (or bias, theory, or simply defensive attribution) is a social psychological term where an observer attributes the causes for a misfortune to minimize their fear of being a victim or a cause in a similar situation. The attributions of blame are negatively correlated to similarities between the observer and the people involved in the misfortune, i.e. more responsibility is attributed to the people involved who are dissimilar to the observer. Assigning responsibility allows the observer to believe that the misfortune was controllable and thus preventable.

A defensive attribution may also be used to protect the person's self-esteem if, despite everything, the misfortune does occur, because blame can be assigned to the "other" (person or situation). The use of defensive attributions is considered a cognitive bias because an individual will change their beliefs about a situation based upon their motivations or desires rather than the factual characteristics of the situation.

== Research ==
Walster (1966) hypothesized that it can be frightening to believe that a misfortune could happen to anyone at random, and attributing responsibility to the person(s) involved helps to manage this emotional reaction.

Shaver (1970) recognized that the similarity of the witness to the person(s) involved in the misfortune – in terms of situation, age, gender, personality, etc. – changes the amount of responsibility one is ready to ascribe. Where Walster's work suggested increases in attributed responsibility, Shaver's concept of "defensive attribution" argued for minimization of assigned responsibility based on perceived similarities between the attributor and the person(s) involved. Shaver was able to demonstrate this response by describing events to test subjects; varying the situations and people described to either match or be significantly different from the subjects: as similarity with witnesses increased, attributions of responsibility decreased.

In 1981 Jerry Burger published a meta-analysis of 22 peer-reviewed studies on the defensive attribution hypothesis, in which he found strong evidence to support Shaver's hypothesized negative relationship between similarity and responsibility.

== Sexual assault ==
A 2008 review of studies examining judgments of hypothetical rape scenarios concluded that "participants who viewed themselves as similar to the victim attributed more blame to the perpetrator".

== See also ==
- Attribution bias
- Just-world fallacy
- Omission bias
- Self-serving bias
- Victim blaming

== Bibliography ==
- Aronson, Elliot; Wilson, Timothy D.; Akert, Robin M.; Sommers, Samuel R. (2015). Social Psychology (9th ed.). Pearson Education. pp. 107–108. ISBN 9780133936544.
- Greenberg, Jeff (2007). "Defensive Attribution". In Baumeister, Roy F.; Vohs, Kathleen D. (eds.). Encyclopedia of Social Psychology. SAGE Publications, Inc. doi:10.4135/9781412956253.n137. ISBN 9781412916707.
- Weiten, Wayne; Dunn, Dana S.; Hammer, Elizabeth Yost (2014). Psychology Applied to Modern Life: Adjustment in the 21st Century. Cengage Learning. p. 208. ISBN 9781305172081.
