= In-group favoritism =

Psychological bias towards favoring members of one's in-group

In-group favoritism, sometimes known as in-group–out-group bias, in-group bias, intergroup bias, or in-group preference, is a pattern of favoring members of one's in-group over out-group members. This can be expressed in the evaluation of others via the ultimate attribution error, in the allocation of resources, and in many other ways.

This effect has been researched by many psychologists and linked to many theories related to group conflict and prejudice. It is a bias that is consistently observed across cultures and is especially pronounced when mutual dependence is high. The phenomenon is primarily viewed from a social psychology standpoint. Studies have shown that in-group favoritism arises as a result of the formation of cultural groups. These cultural groups can be divided based on seemingly trivial observable traits, but with time, populations grow to associate certain traits with certain behavior, increasing covariation. This then incentivizes in-group bias.

Two prominent theoretical approaches to the phenomenon of in-group favoritism are realistic conflict theory and social identity theory. Realistic conflict theory proposes that intergroup competition, and sometimes intergroup conflict, arises when two groups have opposing claims to scarce resources. In contrast, social identity theory posits a psychological drive for positively distinct social identities as the general root cause of in-group favoring behavior.

== Origins of the research tradition ==
In 1906, the sociologist William Sumner posited that humans are a species that join together in groups by their very nature. However, he also maintained that humans had an innate tendency to favor their own group over others, proclaiming how "each group nourishes its own pride and vanity, boasts itself superior, exists in its own divinities, and looks with contempt on outsiders". This is seen on the group level with ingroup–outgroup bias. When experienced in larger groups such as tribes, ethnic groups, or nations, it is referred to as ethnocentrism.

== Explanations ==
=== Competition ===
Realistic conflict theory (or realistic group conflict) posits that competition between groups for resources is the cause of in-group bias and the corresponding negative treatment of members of the out-group. Muzafer Sherif's Robbers Cave Experiment is the most widely known demonstration of realistic conflict theory. In the experiment, 22 eleven-year-old boys with similar backgrounds were studied in a mock summer camp situation, with researchers posing as camp personnel.

The boys were divided into two equal groups and encouraged to bond, to foster an in-group mentality. The researchers then introduced a series of competitive activities that pitted groups against each other for a valuable prize. Hostility and out-group negativity ensued. Lastly, researchers attempted to reverse the hostility by engaging the boys in situations of mutual interdependence, an effort which eventually resulted in relative harmony between the two groups.

Sherif concluded from this experiment that negative attitudes toward out-groups arise when groups compete for limited resources. However, he also theorized that inter-group frictions could be reduced and positive relations created, but only in the presence of an overarching goal, which could only be achieved with the two groups' cooperation.

=== Self-esteem ===
According to social identity theory, as well as terror management theory, one of the key determinants of group biases is the need to improve self-esteem. The desire to view oneself positively is transferred onto the group, creating a tendency to view one's own group in a positive light, and by comparison, outside groups in a negative light. That is, individuals will find a reason, no matter how insignificant, to prove to themselves why their own group is superior. This phenomenon was pioneered and studied most extensively by Henri Tajfel, a British social psychologist who looked at the psychological root of in-group/out-group bias. To study this in the lab, Tajfel and colleagues created minimal groups (see minimal group paradigm), which occur when "complete strangers are formed into groups using the most trivial criteria imaginable." In Tajfel's studies, participants were split into groups by flipping a coin, and each group was then told to appreciate a certain style of painting, none of which the participants were familiar with when the experiment began. What Tajfel and his colleagues discovered was that—regardless of the facts that a) participants did not know each other, b) their groups were completely meaningless, and c) none of the participants had any inclination as to which "style" they like better—participants almost always "liked the members of their own group better and they rated the members of their in-group as more likely to have pleasant personalities". By having a more positive impression of individuals in the in-group, individuals are able to boost their own self-esteem as members of that group. Research using Implicit Association Tests has shown that individuals can simultaneously hold positive implicit attitudes toward both in-group and out-group members, depending on contextual factors.

Robert Cialdini and his research team looked at the number of university T-shirts being worn on college campuses following either a win or a loss at the football game. They found that the Monday after a win, there were more T-shirts being worn, on average, than following a loss.

In another set of studies, done in the 1980s by Jennifer Crocker and colleagues using the minimal group paradigm, individuals with high self-esteem who suffered a threat to the self-concept exhibited greater ingroup biases than did people with low self-esteem who suffered a threat to the self-concept. While some studies have supported this notion of a negative correlation between self-esteem and in-group bias, other researchers have found that individuals with low self-esteem showed more bias toward both in-group and out-group members. Some studies have even shown that high self-esteem groups showed more bias than did lower self-esteem groups. This research may suggest that there is an alternative explanation and additional reasoning as to the relationship between self-esteem and in-group/out-group biases. Alternatively, researchers may have used the wrong sort of self-esteem measures to test the link between self-esteem and in-group bias (global personal self-esteem rather than specific social self-esteem).

=== Biological basis as an effect of oxytocin ===
In a meta-analysis and review of the effect of oxytocin on social behavior done by Carsten De Dreu, the research reviewed shows that oxytocin enables the development of trust, specifically towards individuals with similar characteristics—categorized as 'in-group' members—promoting cooperation with and favoritism towards such individuals. This bias of oxytocin-induced goodwill towards those with features and characteristics perceived to be similar may have evolved as a biological basis for sustaining in-group cooperation and protection, fitting with the Darwinian insight that acts of self-sacrifice and cooperation contribute to the functioning of the group and hence improve the odds of survival for members of said group.

Race can be used as an example of in-group and out-group tendencies because society often categorizes individuals into groups based on race (Caucasian, African American, Latino, etc.). One study that examined race and empathy found that participants receiving nasally administered oxytocin had stronger reactions to pictures of in-group members making pained faces than to pictures of out-group members with the same expression. This shows that oxytocin may be implicated in our ability to empathize with individuals of different races, with individuals of one race potentially biased towards helping individuals of the same race rather individuals of another race when they are experiencing pain.

Oxytocin has also been implicated in lying when lying would prove beneficial to other in-group members. In a study where such a relationship was examined, it was found that when individuals were administered oxytocin, rates of dishonesty in the participants' responses increased for their in-group members when a beneficial outcome for their group was expected. Both of these examples show the tendency to act in ways that benefit in-group members.

In social psychology, aside from its biological effects, this study is among the most cited on the relationship between prosociality and one's social category. Research on oxytocin indicates that trusting, cooperative responding, and empathy are expressed internally, whereas these behaviors are absent or occur at lower levels among out-group members. Theories of intergroup bias complement this; they assert that individuals can exhibit bias toward their ingroup without being hostile toward the outgroup. Therefore, the biological effects of oxytocin have increasingly been recognized as supporting the maintenance of group boundaries rather than prosociality in general.

=== Self-identity and social identity ===
As noted in two recent theoretical reviews, the theoretical basis for the inclusion of self-identity in the theories of reasoned action and planned behavior has many similarities to social identity theory and its extension, self-categorization theory. According to social identity theory, an important component of the self-concept is derived from memberships in social groups and categories. When people define and evaluate themselves in terms of a self-inclusive social category (e.g., sex, class, team) two processes come into play: (1) categorization, which perceptually accentuates differences between the in-group and out-group, and similarities among in-group members (including the self) on stereotypical dimensions; and (2) self-enhancement which, because the self-concept is defined in terms of group membership, seeks behaviorally and perceptually to favor the in-group over the out-group. Social identities are cognitively represented as group prototypes that describe and prescribe beliefs, attitudes, feelings and behaviors that optimize a balance between minimization of in-group differences and maximization of intergroup differences.

More specifically, according to social identity theory, there is a continuum between personal and social identity shifts along this continuum that determines the extent to which group-related or personal characteristics influence a person's feelings and actions. If a particular social identity is a salient basis for self-conception, then the self is assimilated to the perceived in-group prototype, which can be thought of as a set of perceived in-group norms such that self-perception, beliefs, attitudes, feelings and behaviors are defined in terms of the group prototype. Thus, social identities should influence behavior through the mediating role of group norms. People will be more likely to engage in a particular behavior if it is in accord with the norms of a behaviorally relevant group membership, particularly if the identity is a salient basis for self-definition. If the group membership is not salient, then people's behavior and feelings should be in accord with their own personal and idiosyncratic characteristics rather than group norms.

On the other hand, the self-identity theory poses that the self is often a reflection of expected norms and practices in a person's social role. At the center of it is the proposition that the self is made up of multi-faceted and differentiated components that exist in an organized manner for the sake of filling in roles in society. People are able to create an identity for themselves only through talking to others, and often, the roles they are taking on differ from one group to another. These differing roles and positions people fill are a result of their interactions with others and are called role identities. Role identities may be self-realized, or may be facts like being a mother, a social worker, or a blood donor. Role identities lead people to act in certain ways due to assumed expectations for the roles. Because there is satisfaction in complying with expectations of the role, there is often distress behind an inability to appear congruent with one's identity as defined by societal norms. There is also an existing hierarchy of importance for roles that individuals take on, and according to the hierarchical standing of roles, people become more representative of roles that stand higher hierarchically, according to them.

Identity salience, the likelihood of role identities being invoked in different situations, is the result of role identities being placed hierarchically in different orders from person to person. People who hold the same roles may act differently because some roles are valued over others. For example, a working mother may have less time to spend with her child as opposed to a mother who does not work. Behaviors are reflective of the identities that are held higher hierarchically by people, so people act out in self-worth and self-meaning according to these hierarchies. Someone who holds the identity of being a psychologist higher than the identity of being a linguist will find that while he/she may become competitive when meeting another person who is better at psychology than he/she, he/she will not care when in contact with someone much better at being a linguist than he/she. In a similar way, social relationships are influenced by this salience. Self-identity often places individuals in social contexts and a commitment to the role within that context becomes a big part of perpetuating the idea of self. It also finds people relating more to others who hold similar role identities at the top of their hierarchies.

Because people have self-concepts that are derived from a role they define for themselves within the context of a group, when staying within their roles, intergroup similarities are accentuated while intergroup differences are diminished. In an attempt to assimilate oneself according to the tendencies of a group, often people reconfigure their intragroup representations or identities. Certain prototypes form about these groups that reaffirm the rules that members of the group are encouraged to follow. Shared information and views are discussed more often than novel and unshared information within a group, a norm is established where the majority's views are perpetuated and others silenced. This norm is fluid and changing according to different contexts, but those within the group who want to keep up with the majority views in all matters have to keep an active role in affirming the views of the in-group in contrast to out-groups.

=== Neuroscience of social categorization ===
Various neural correlates are impacted by group membership, which can shed light on the development of biases toward in-group members. The brain plays a critical role in how individuals classify themselves and others based on personal attributes, as explained by the social identity theory.

Research shows that the medial prefrontal cortex (mPFC) region displays increased activity when individuals engage in group categorization. This increased activity in this brain region is activated because people tend to focus on the positive qualities of their group. This increased brain activity has been linked to social identity, which is a portion of one's personality that comes from being a member of a specific group. This part of the brain is also activated when we think about personal qualities. People tend to want to feel good about themselves and base their personality on the groups they are part of. People then focus on the positives of their group which leads to people favoring their group and seeing it better than other groups. If people do this, then they will also feel good about themselves because they perceive themselves as being part of a high-status group.

More specifically, the ventral medial prefrontal cortex becomes active when individuals categorize themselves into groups with whom they already share prior experience which can be based on characteristics such as race, ethnicity, or gender. This region of the brain is activated due to emotional social reasoning where self-referential processing leads individuals to view the in-group as closer to the self than the out-group. Emotional social reasoning is also significant with groups of prior experience because the categorizations have developed over a longer duration leading to the development of emotions. Alternatively, the dorsal medial prefrontal cortex is activated when individuals categorize themselves into groups with whom they have no prior experience with such as randomly being divided into teams to compete in a task. In this case, individuals must use abstract social reasoning, a part of the dorsal medial prefrontal cortex, to form self-guided ideas for categorical identification. With newly formed groups, individuals do not have an emotional component which is why the ventral medial prefrontal cortex is not activated.

=== Political Identity ===
Field experiments reveal that individuals are significantly more likely to help others who share their political identity, highlighting how in-group favoritism extends into partisan behavior.

== Evolution of in-groups ==
=== Formation of cultural groups ===
Studies have shown that in-group favoritism arises endogenously, through the formation of cultural groups. Symbolic markers in certain conditions can result in trivial groupings developing into cultural groups. The formation of such cultural groups then results in a higher degree of in-group favoritism. A large-scale cross-national study found that national identity and trust in institutions are key predictors of in-group favoritism, with notable variation across 17 countries.

Efferson, Lalive and Fehr published such a study in 2008, utilizing a series of coordination games to mimic cooperation between individuals. The study found that cultural groups were able to form endogenously through creation of a linkage between a payoff-relevant behavior and a payoff-irrelevant marker. Subsequently, in-group favoritism occurred in ensuing social interactions.

Participants were first divided into one of several populations of ten people, and then further divided into subpopulations of five. Each group had different payoff for coordinating on one of two choices, behavior A or behavior B. In group 1, participants were awarded 41 points for coordinating (choosing A themselves and choosing another participant who also chose A) on A and 21 for coordinating on B. The payoffs were switched in the second group. In both groups participants were awarded just 1 point for mis-coordinating. During each turn participants were also allowed to choose a payoff-irrelevant marker (circle or triangle). Players from both subpopulations were mixed to create a coordination problem, and every turn, an unidentified player from each subpopulation would be randomly switched.

The experiment created a situation in which participants were strongly incentivized to develop a sense of expected behaviors in his or her subpopulation, but occasionally would find themselves in a totally new situation in which their behaviors were not in-line with social norms.

The results showed that players generally developed an inclination to pair behavior with a marker, especially if it had resulted in a positive payoff. As linkages at an individual level increase, covariation (of marker and behavior) at an aggregate level also increases. In the experiment, there was a significant increase in participants requesting for partners with the same-shape choice as it progressed, although the initial choice of shape had no effect on payoffs. Toward the end of the experiment, this number stood at a substantial 87%, indicating the presence of in-group favoritism.

Their study supported the hypothesis that the formation of cultural groups alters selective pressure facing individuals, and thus leads to certain behavioral traits being advantageous. Thus, if such selective pressures were present in past civilizations, where membership in a certain group is correlated with a certain behavioral norm, the emergence of in-group biases where it is beneficial to act in differing manners to members of the same group is certainly plausible.

=== Workplace perceptions and in group favoritism ===
According to Weeks et al., generational stereotypes in the workplace such as those involving Millennials and Generation X were examined in relation to variables like in-group favoritism and in-group bolstering within the context of work-life balance. Stereotypes (e.g., younger employees being better with technology) played a really determining role. The results showed that in groups , in-group favoritism was observed at a statistically significant level with all of the generational groups.However, regarding the work-life balance variable, in-group favoritism was occur across all generations each generation evaluated its own group more positively than others. On the other hand, in domains such as technology use and work ethic, in-group favoritism tended to decrease. Nevertheless, individuals were generally evaluated and defended more positively by members of their own group compared to those outside the group. So, individuals tend to perceive and defend members of their own generational group more favorably than those of other groups, regardless of the domain.The research also shows that stereotypes can create tension and conflict in the workplace. In such cases, individuals develop defensive strategies to protect their own groups and Conversely, where stereotypes are weak, a more classic form of in-group favoritism emerges.

== Racial and ethnic differences ==
In the United States, political candidates sharing racial and ethnic background was extremely or very important for 25% of Black Americans, for 17% of Hispanic Americans, 16% of Asian American, and 5% of White Americans according to a 2023 Pew Research Center study.

== Gender differences ==
=== Automatic bias for own gender ===
Rudman and Goodwin conducted research on gender bias that measured gender preferences without directly asking the participants. Subjects at Purdue and Rutgers University participated in computerized tasks that measured automatic attitudes based on how quickly a person categorizes pleasant and unpleasant attributes with each gender. Such a task was done to discover whether people associate pleasant words (good, happy, and sunshine) with women, and unpleasant words (bad, trouble, and pain) with men.

This research found that while both women and men have more favorable views of women, women's in-group biases were 4.5 times stronger than those of men and only women (not men) showed cognitive balance among in-group bias, identity, and self-esteem, revealing that men lack a mechanism that bolsters automatic preference for their own gender.

In a 2023 United States study 22% of women and 13% of men found at least somewhat important that political candidates share their gender.

=== Competition ===
Using a public goods game, Van Vugt, De Cremer, and Janssen found that men contributed more to their group in the face of outside competition from another group; there was no distinct difference amongst women's contributions.

=== Ethnicity-based favoritism ===
In 2001 Fershtman and Gneezy found that men showed in-group biases in a "trust" game based on ethnicity, whereas this tendency was not present in women. The study aims to identify ethnic discrimination in Israeli Jewish society, and was conducted on 996 Israeli undergraduates. Groups were separated based on whether the participant's name was typically ethnically Eastern or Ashkenazic. Similar to a dictator game, subjects were instructed to divide a sum of money (20 NIS) between themselves and another player. Player A was told that any money sent over to Player B would be tripled, and Player B would receive details of the experiment, including the name of Player A and the transferred sum. Subsequently, Player B would have a choice of whether to send any money back.

The experiment found that despite sharing similar average transfer values (10.63 for women and 11.42 for men), women did not display significant in-group biases when it came to recipients with either Ashkenazic or Eastern sounding names. However, a bias against Eastern sounding names was present amongst men.

Furthermore, men showed more bias for Ashkenazic men compared to women, but the opposite was true for Eastern names. This result may seem counter-intuitive, as participants appear to share more in common if they were both male. Thus, we would expect Eastern females to be more marginalized, but is actually consistent with other studies which studied discrimination against Afro-American women.

=== Developmental age ===
In 2008 Fehr, Bernhard, and Rockenbach, in a study conducted on children, found that boys displayed in-group favoritism from ages 3–8, whereas girls did not display such tendencies. The experiment involved usage of an "envy game", a modified version of the dictator game. A possible explanation posited by researchers relied on an evolutionary basis.

They theorized that parochialism and favoring members of the same group may have been particularly advantageous as it strengthened the individuals group position in intergroup conflicts. As males were the ones who were frequently at the forefront of such conflicts in the past, and thus bore the majority of the costs of conflicts in terms of injury or death, evolution may have favored a greater sensitivity in males in situations which resulted in an advantageous payoff for their in-group. Thus males tended to show in-group biases from a younger age than females, as was evident in the experiment.

=== In hiring ===
Correspondence studies show mixed evidence of gender in-group favoritism in hiring, with some finding no effect and others finding it only among recruiters of one gender. One study finds that recruiters of both genders display in-group favoritism by preferring candidates of their own gender, and that the predominance of women in recruiter positions can translate this bias into an aggregate pattern of favorable treatment of female candidates at the selection stage across occupations.

== Other examples ==
=== Armenian genocide denial ===
A 2013 study found that Turks with a stronger in-group bias were less likely to acknowledge the in-group responsibility for the Armenian genocide.

=== 2008 US Presidential elections ===
A study conducted during the 2008 Presidential elections showcased how group identities were dynamic. The study was carried out among 395 Democrats from Cambridge, MA, using an Economics dictator game. Subjects were given $6 to divide between themselves and another person. The recipients remained anonymous, apart from which candidate they supported in the Democratic Primaries.

Data were collected in three separate periods. June 10 to 18 (after Hillary Clinton's concession speech on June 7); August 9 to 14, before the Democratic National Convention on the 25; and September 2 to 5, in the buildup to the Presidential elections. The results showed that men displayed significant in-group favoritism from June all the way to the DNC in August. This in-group bias, however, was not present in September. Women displayed no significant in-group favoritism throughout.

The experiment suggested that group identities are flexible and can change over time. Researchers theorized that in-group bias was strong in June, as the competition to be the Democratic nominee in the elections was still recent and thus salient. A lack of actual electoral conflict (against the Republicans) caused perception of salient groupings to remain throughout August. Only in September did the in-group favoritism subside as a superordinate goal shared between groups was now present.

=== Wikipedia ===
Research analyzing articles about 35 inter-group conflicts (e.g., Falklands War) by comparing the corresponding language versions of Wikipedia (e.g., English, Spanish) found evidence for in-group favoritism: While the "in-group" was systematically preferred and presented in a more favorable light, the "out-group" was presented as more immoral and more responsible for the conflict. There were substantial variations between conflicts, however, and additional analyses revealed in-group favoritism to be more pronounced in more recent conflicts and in articles written predominantly by "in-group" members.

== Versus out-group negativity ==
Social psychologists have long made the distinction between ingroup favoritism and outgroup negativity, where outgroup negativity is the act of punishing or placing burdens upon the outgroup. Indeed, a significant body of research exists that attempts to identify the relationship between ingroup favoritism and outgroup negativity, as well as conditions that will lead to outgroup negativity. For example, Struch and Schwartz found support for the predictions of belief congruence theory. The belief congruence theory concerns itself with the degree of similarity in beliefs, attitudes, and values perceived to exist between individuals. This theory also states that dissimilarity increases negative orientations towards others. When applied to racial discrimination, the belief congruence theory argues that the perceived dissimilarity of beliefs has more of an impact on racial discrimination than does race itself.

Studies show that in group favoritism is a stronger factor than out group negativity or derogation in explaining intergroup relations (Mummendey and Otten, 1998; Hewstone et al., 2002). The study by Halevy et al. (2012) is particularly important these researchers used IPD-MD to examine the role of preference-based in group favoritism and out group contempt in explaining in group favoritism. The findings showed that group members were not inherently competitive or aggressive, and when given a choice, participants preferred cooperation to maximize the group's overall gain rather than competing for relative gain with the out group. Furthermore, the results revealed that in group liking prevailed over out group contempt even after intergroup conflict (Halevy et al., 2012).

Research finds evidence of in-group bias in police investigations and judicial decisions.

=== Biological relationship ===
Oxytocin is not only correlated with the preferences of individuals to associate with members of their own group, but it is also evident during conflicts between members of different groups. During conflict, individuals receiving nasally administered oxytocin demonstrate more frequent defense-motivated responses toward in-group members than out-group members. Further, oxytocin was correlated with participant desire to protect vulnerable in-group members, despite that individual's attachment to the conflict. Similarly, it has been demonstrated that when oxytocin is administered, individuals alter their subjective preferences in order to align with in-group ideals over out-group ideals. These studies demonstrate that oxytocin is associated with intergroup dynamics.

Further, oxytocin influences the responses of individuals in a particular group to those of another group. The in-group bias is evident in smaller groups; however, it can also be extended to groups as large as one's entire country leading toward a tendency of strong national zeal. A study done in the Netherlands showed that oxytocin increased the in-group favoritism of their nation while decreasing acceptance of members of other ethnicities and foreigners. People also show more affection for their country's flag while remaining indifferent to other cultural objects when exposed to oxytocin. It has thus been hypothesized that this hormone may be a factor in xenophobic tendencies secondary to this effect. Thus, oxytocin appears to affect individuals at an international level where the in-group becomes a specific "home" country and the out-group grows to include all other countries.

== In-group derogation ==
Cross-cultural studies have found that in-group derogation, the tendency to criticize members of one's own group or culture more harshly than members of outside groups, is more common among members of disadvantaged and minority groups than among members of the majority or dominant group. According to Ma-Kellams, Spencer-Rodgers and Peng, system justification theory seeks to explain why "minorities sometimes endorse system-justifying views of their group". They said their research into in-group favoritism and derogation partially supported this theory, but that the theory failed to address all of the nuances.

Ma-Kellams et al. also found that, compared to individualist cultures, people from collectivist cultures, such as East Asian cultures, tended to judge their own group members less favorably than they judged outsiders, whereas people from individualist cultures were inclined to judge members of their own group more favorably than they judged outsiders. Social identity theory and Freudian theorists explain in-group derogation as the result of a negative self-image, which they believe is then extended to the group. Ma-Kellams et al. theorized that "ingroup derogation may be more culturally normative and less troubling for East Asians" as evidenced by the fact that East Asians were also likely to report high levels of positive affect (emotion) towards members of their in-group, demonstrating ambivalence towards the unfavorable characteristics they had acknowledged about their in-group. According to Ma-Kellam et al., culturally-ingrained attitudes and beliefs, rather than low self-esteem, may play a role in collectivist cultures' in-group derogation, due to their ability to tolerate holding seemingly contradictory views.

== In-group favoritism in sports ==
In-group favoritism is one of the term observed in the context of sports. In the context of sports, in-group bias refers to evaluating one’s own team and its fans positively, while labeling the rival team and its supporters negatively. Fans form a strong identity bond with the teams they support, and this bond affects individuals’ perceptions and evaluations. Sports fans often exhibit in-group bias by evaluating fellow in-group fans more positively than rival out-group fans. Existing data show that the effect of in-group bias is strongly influenced by the individual’s connection to the team and the feeling of threat. Individuals with a high level of identification show higher levels of in-group favoritism compared to those with lower levels of identification. Additionally, when highly identified individuals feel a threat such as threats related to game outcome or game location, in-group favoritism can also be used as a coping mechanism by those experiencing the threat. Moreover, game location has been found to be more of a threat factor for fans rather than athletes; fans feel more threatened during home games, while those in away game settings feel like outsiders. At the same time, it has been found that as the number of away fans increases, home team supporters’ perceived threat also increases and unşted more like we feeling. Regarding the sports related event results, although it was expected that the losing team would show higher in-group favoritism, the results were the opposite and the winning team showed higher favoritism. This has been explained by the reduced possibility of changing the situation after the game.And authors emphasized that the data collected from the after certain conclusion of the contest. In addition, fans of the winning team tend to reinforce their team’s victory through in-group favoritism, expressing perceived superiority, which in result with increases in-group bias.

== See also ==
- Basking in reflected glory
- Closure (sociology)
- Collective narcissism
- Common ingroup identity
- Cronyism
- Groupthink
- Linguistic intergroup bias
- Marginalization
- Marking your own homework
- Nepotism
- Old boy network
- Out-group homogeneity
- Parochial altruism
- Priming
- Psychological projection
- Protectionism
- Scapegoating
- Social dominance orientation
- Social projection
- Terror management theory
- Xenophobia
- Outgroup favoritism
- Ultimate attribution error
