= Interdependence theory =

Theory of social exchange

Interdependence theory is a social exchange theory developed in social psychology that examines how interpersonal relationships are defined through interpersonal interdependence, which is "the process by which interacting people influence one another's experiences".^{p. 65} Originally proposed by Harold H. Kelley and John Thibaut in 1959, the theory provides a conceptual framework for analyzing the structure of interpersonal situations and how individuals' outcomes depend not only on their own actions but also on the actions of others.

The most basic principle of the theory is encapsulated in the equation I = ƒ[A, B, S], which states that all interpersonal interactions (I) are a function (ƒ) of the given situation (S), plus the actions and characteristics of the individuals (A & B) in the interaction. This equation represents how people's behaviors, thoughts, and emotions in relationships are influenced by both situational structures and psychological processes.

The theory's four basic assumptions are:

1. The Principle of Structure: Interpersonal situations have definable patterns of interdependence that shape interaction.
2. The Principle of Transformation: People may transform a given situation according to their motivations, values, and broader relationship goals.
3. The Principle of Interaction: Outcomes in relationships are determined by the mutual influence of both parties' actions.
4. The Principle of Adaptation: Individuals develop behavioral patterns over time in response to recurring situations of interdependence.

== Authors ==
Interdependence theory was first introduced by Harold Kelley and John Thibaut in 1959 in their book, The Social Psychology of Groups. This book drew inspiration from social exchange theory and game theory, and provided key definitions and concepts instrumental to the development of the interdependence framework. In their second book, Interpersonal Relations: A Theory of Interdependence, the theory was completely formalized in 1978. Harold Kelley continued the development of Interdependence theory in 2003, with the book An Atlas of Interpersonal Situations. This book expanded on the previous work by adding two additional dimensions to the dimensions of interdependence, as well as by analyzing 21 specific situation types. In addition, the work of Kelly and Thibaut built on the work of Kurt Lewin, who first defined interdependence, and stated that ""The essence of a group is not the similarity or dissimilarity of its members, but their interdependence . . . A change in the state of any subpart changes the state of any other subpart . . . Every move of one member will, relatively speaking, deeply affect the other members, and the state of the group" (pp. 84–88).

== Four basic assumptions of interdependence theory ==
=== Principle of structure (the situation) ===
All interactions are set within the context of their given situation (known in Interdependence theory as structure). In order to best analyze this factor, Interdependence theory presents a taxonomy of situations that includes the six dimensions listed below. A key concept with the Principle of Structure is Affordance, or what the situation affords (makes possible) for the individuals within the interaction.

- Six dimensions of structure:
1. Degree/level of dependence. This dimension focuses on the level of reliance that one member of an interaction has on another member of the interaction. This dimension is characterized by the following types of control, a) Actor Control- the impact of individual's behavior on the individual's outcomes, b) Partner Control- the impact of each individual behavior on the outcomes of the other individuals in the interaction, c) Joint Control- the joint impact of each individual's behavior on each individual's outcome. An example of this would be if person A is able to achieve a positive outcome regardless of the actions of person B, then person A is high in Actor Control. If person A is dependent on the actions of person B to determine if he/she achieves a positive outcome, person A is high in Partner Control. If person A and person B are dependent on each other to achieve a positive outcome, they are high in Joint Control.
2. Mutuality of dependence. This dimension focuses on the level (and equality of) dependence each individual within the interaction has with the other individual(s) within the interaction. As person A become more dependent on person B, person B gains greater control over person A.
3. Covariation of interest. This dimension analyzes the level of gratification each individual within an interaction receives based on the outcome produced. This dimension could range from completely corresponding levels of gratification (coordination) to conflicting gratification (zero-sum) (or any range between these extremes). An example of corresponding levels of gratification would be a situation in which person A and person B both simply attempt to achieve outcomes in their own best interests, but in so doing also achieve outcomes in the best interest of the other. An example of conflicting gratification is a situation where all outcomes that are positive to one individual are completely negative to the other individual in the interaction.
4. Basis of dependence. This dimension focuses on the means of influence that one member of an interaction has on the other member of the interaction. This dimension is characterized by the following types of control, a) Actor Control- the impact of individual's behavior on the individual's outcomes, b) Partner Control- the impact of each individual behavior on the outcomes of the other individuals in the interaction, c) Joint Control- the joint impact of each individual's behavior on each individual's outcome. Examples of means of influence include promises, threats, reliance on social/moral norms, unilateral action, and turn-taking.
5. Temporal structure. Temporal structure focuses on the effects that timing and sequential process have on situations. Key concepts in this dimension include, 1) Situational Selection, or the "movement from one situation to another, bringing partners to a new situation that differs from the prior situation in terms of behavioral options or outcomes" (Van Lange & Balliet, 2014, p. 71), as well as what Axelrod coined 2) "The shadow of the future" (Van Lange & Balliet, 2014, p. 79), or long term strategy of cooperating in anticipation of future reciprocal rewards from the other individual in future interactions.
6. Information availability. Information availability focuses on the amount of information individuals have concerning the other individual's motives, potential iteration outcomes, and the potential future opportunities any given interaction may bring about. This dimension suggests that misunderstanding is often rooted in low levels of information availability. An example of this would be if person A has certain information about the goals and motivations of person B, person A's actions will be effected differently than if that information was uncertain.

=== Principle of transformation (what people make of the situation) ===
Transformation is a psychological process through which individuals consider possible outcomes that result from both their action and the action of others, and weigh these outcomes against possible actions and courses of actions (Rewards and costs).

- Rewards and costs
  - Interdependence theory stipulates that an ideal relationship is characterized with high levels of rewards and low levels of costs. Rewards are "exchanged resources that are pleasurable and gratifying," while costs are "exchanged resources that result in a loss or punishment." There are different types of rewards and costs discussed in this theory. This theory distinguishes between four types of rewards and costs. These types are as follows: emotional, social, instrumental, and opportunity.
    - Emotional
      - Emotional rewards and costs are the positive and negative feelings, respectively, that are experienced in a relationship. These types of rewards and costs are especially pertinent to close relationships.
    - Social
      - Social rewards and costs are those related with a person's social appearance and the ability to interact in social environments. Social rewards deal with the positive aspect of a person's social appearance and the enjoyable social situations in which one must engage. On the other hand, social costs are those that relate to the negative aspect of a person's social appearance and the uninteresting social situations to which a person must attend.
    - Instrumental
      - Instrumental rewards and costs deal with activities and/or tasks in a relationship. Instrumental rewards are those that are obtained when a person's partner is proficient in handling tasks, such as getting all the laundry finished. Instrumental costs are just the opposite; they occur when a person's relationship partner causes unnecessary work or the partner impedes the other's progress in a task, such as one person in a relationship not doing any of the housework.
    - Opportunity
      - Opportunity rewards and costs are associated with the opportunities that arise in relationships. Opportunity rewards are those gains that a person is able to receive in their relationship, which they would not be able to receive on their own. Opportunity costs occur when a person must give up something that they normally would not for the sake of the relationship.
- Outcome Transformation. Outcome transformation is the concept that individuals may take into account their own outcomes as well as the outcome for the other individual in the interaction. There are orientations that individuals take when considering outcomes for the other individual in an interaction (known as nonindividualistic orientations of outcome transformation). These nonidividualistic orientations of outcome transformation include the following:
  - Cooperation (MaxJoint): maximizes joint outcomes
  - Equality (MinDiff): minimizes differences in outcomes
  - Altruism (MaxOther): maximizes positive outcomes for others
  - Aggression (MinOther) minimizes positive outcomes for others

=== Principle of interaction (SABI: I = ƒ[A, B, S]) ===
The Principle of Interaction (also referred to as the SABI model) is used to assess the variable that affect any given interaction. This model states that Interactions (I) are a function (ƒ) of the situation, Person A's (A) motives, traits, and actions, plus Person B's (B) motives, traits, and actions (I = ƒ[A, B, S]).

There are several factors that individuals bring to the Interaction. They are their consideration of Outcomes, Comparison Level, and Comparison Level for Alternatives.

- Outcomes
  - With every relationship there is an outcome. These outcomes are determined by comparing the amount of rewards present in a relationship versus the amount of costs present. "According to interdependence theory, people mentally account for rewards and costs so they can evaluate the outcome of their relationship as either positive or negative." The outcome is determined to be positive when the rewards outweigh the costs in a relationship. Conversely, the outcome is negative when the costs outweigh the rewards.
- Comparison level (CL)
  - Interdependence theory also takes into account comparison level. This involves the expectation of the kinds of outcomes a person expects to receive in a relationship. These expectations are 'compared' to a person's past relationships and current observations of others' relationships. "Satisfaction depends on expectation, which is shaped by prior experience, especially gripping events of the recent past." A person will have a high comparison level, if all the relationships that they have been exposed to are happy. Therefore, to determine whether or not someone is in a satisfying relationship, it is necessary to consider both the rewards and costs evident in that relationship as well as that person's own comparison level.
- Comparison Level for Alternative (CL-alt)
  - Comparison level correlated with the rewards and costs of a relationship determine satisfaction and commitment for a particular person in a relationship. However, there are some situations where people may be committed, but not have a satisfying relationship or they may be satisfied in their relationship, but not committed to it. Thus, the quality of alternatives helps people understand the 'alternatives' they have outside of their current relationship. Alternatives can be any other option rather than the one currently held. When people have good alternatives, they tend to be less committed to their relationships. By contrast, when people have poor alternatives, they tend to be highly committed to their relationships.

=== Principle of adaptation ===
Adaption refers to the process by where exposure to similar situations gives rise to habitual responses which have been proven to result in (on average) positive outcomes. In addition to the type of exposure based condition just described, adaptation can result based on rules of social norms. For example, person A might enter into a situation that is similar to situations he/she has experienced before, based on these previous experiences person A's actions are guided in a way in which to receive the same positive outcomes as the previous situations produced. Similarly, social norms guide individuals toward specific, society approved, actions.

== Academic and practical applications ==
Interdependence theory has been used by academics to "analyze group dynamics, power and dependence, social comparison, conflict and cooperation, attribution and self-presentation, trust and distrust, emotions, love and commitment, coordination and communication, risk and self-regulation, performance and motivation, social development, and neuroscientific model of social interaction" (Van Lange & Balliet, 2014, p. 67).

In addition, the theory provides a practical framework for understanding the underlying psychological factors that motivate other individuals in which you interact (in both personal and professional settings), as well as providing a framework for understanding the underlying psychological factors that motivate your own actions when interacting with others.

== Complementary/related theories and frameworks ==
Sources:

- Goal-expectation theory
- Structural goal-expectation theory
- The individual–group discontinuity model
- Game theory
- Theories of Direct Reciprocity and Indirect Reciprocity
- Need-to-belong model
- The investment model of commitment processes
- The model of communal (and exchange) orientations (in close relationships)
- The empathy–altruism model (explaining altruism and prosocial behavior)
- Realistic conflict theory (applied to intergroup processes)
- The dual-concern model (applied in the domains of negotiation and bargaining)
- Equity theory
- Self-expansion approach
- Social exchange theory

== See also ==
- Equity theory
- Interpersonal relationship
- Prisoner's dilemma
- Social exchange theory
