= Edward E. Jones =

American social psychologist

Edward Ellsworth "Ned" Jones
- Born: August 11, 1926; Buffalo, New York, U.S.
- Died: July 30, 1993 (aged 66); Morehead City, North Carolina, U.S.
- Education: Harvard University
- Occupation: Psychologist

For the Louisiana civil rights pioneer, see E. Edward Jones.

Edward Ellsworth "Ned" Jones (August 11, 1926 – July 30, 1993) was an influential American social psychologist, he is known as father of Ingratiation due to his major works in the area. He worked at Duke University and from 1977 at Princeton University. A Review of General Psychology survey, published in 2002, ranked Jones as the 39th most cited psychologist of the 20th century.

Along with Keith E. Davis, he is known for developing correspondent inference theory within the field of psychological attribution.

== Biography ==
He earned his Ph.D. in clinical psychology at Harvard University.

In the classic text Fundamentals of Social Psychology, which he co-wrote with Harold B. Gerard and published in 1967, they explain:

Our aim has been to write a systematic presentation of social psychology that emphasizes the experimental approach....Social psychology is a subdiscipline of psychology that especially involves the scientific study of the behavior of individuals as a function of social stimuli. This definition seems to say something important and to say it with pedantic precision...By the end of World War II, the way was paved for an outpouring of experimental research involving the manipulation of experimental subjects' temporary social environment and an examination of the effects of this manipulation on attitudes, behavior, and various emotional states. Questions of behavioral causation could now be examined with closer scrutiny than was possible through questionnaires and interviews. The outlines of an empirical, and especially an experimental, social psychology have clearly emerged.

Jones's work is centered on the attribution process, co-developing his theory of correspondent inferences with Keith Davis. Jones noted, "I have a candidate for the most robust and repeatable finding in social psychology: the tendency to see behavior as caused by a stable personal disposition of the actor when it can be just as easily explained as a natural response to more than adequate situational pressures." One of the best-known single papers co-authored with Victor Harris in 1967 tested this theory and led to the development of the fundamental attribution error. He also developed the Actor-observer bias with Richard E. Nisbett.

He focused on the history and the advancement of the field of person perception in order to explore how perceivers and targets interact. One form of interaction that he examined closely resulted in a book on the psychology of ingratiation. In his book on ingratiation, he utilized the models of Goffman, Homans, Thibaut, and Kelley to arrive at the following working definition: "Combining these contributions, we may conclude that ingratiation is an illegitimate member of the social exchange family because the ingratiator presents himself as a party to one kind of exchange—with one set of terms and conditions—while in fact he is primarily engaged in another kind."

He further noted the importance of studying ingratiation, writing: "A more valid reason for studying ingratiation is that light might be shed on other common social phenomena such as the antecedents of group cohesiveness, the conditions of social influence and conformity, and the significance of social reinforcement in sequences of social interaction." He was also an opponent of behaviorism.

In 2004, a book of his selected works was published by John Wiley & Sons, edited by former student Daniel Gilbert.

== Notable contributions ==
- Work on Fritz Heider's attribution error, termed fundamental attribution error by Lee Ross, which is also known as "correspondence bias". As Gilbert noted, "As geometry was to architecture, so attribution theories were to person perception. Experiments revealed that people's attributional inferences looked very much like the attributional inferences that a thinking system would generate if it was relying on formal attributional rules such as the calculus of non-common effects, the covariation and discounting principles and so on. But no one knew whether people were actually using those rules, and if they were, certainly no one knew how."
- outgroup homogeneity bias
- self-handicapping
- self-presentation theory

== Former students ==
- Joshua Aronson
- Roy Baumeister
- Kenneth J. Gergen
- Daniel Gilbert
- Linda E. Ginzel
- C. Anderson Johnson
- Fred Rhodewalt
- Camille Wortman

== Books and articles by and about Edward E. Jones ==
- Ginzel, L.E., Jones, E.E. and Swann, WB Jr. (1987) "How Naive is the Naive Attributor?: Discounting and Augmentation in Attitude Attribution" Social Cognition, 5, 108-130.
- Jones, Edward E., and Harold B. Gerard, Fundamentals of Social Psychology, published by John Wiley and Sons, Inc., 1967.
- Jones, Edward E., Interpersonal Perception, published by WH Freeman and Co., 1990.
- Jones, E.E. & Harris, V. A. (1967). The attribution of attitudes. Journal of Experimental Social Psychology 3, 1–24.
- Jones, E. E., & Nisbett, R. E. 1971. The Actor and the Observer: Divergent Perceptions of the Causes of Behavior. New York: General Learning Press.
- Jones, E.E., McGillis, Daniel, "Correspondence Inferences and the Attribution Cube: A Comparative Reappraisal," in John H. Harvey, William J. Ickes, and Robert F. Kidd, ed., New Directions in Attribution Research, Vol. 1 (Hillsdale, N.J.: Erlbaum, 1976), pp. 389–420.
- Jones, E.E., Davis, Keith E., "From Acts to Dispositions: The Attribution Process in Person Perception," in Leonard Berkowitz, ed., Advances in Experimental Social Psychology, Vol. 2 (New York: Academic Press, 1965), p. 225.
- Gilbert, D. T. (1998). Speeding with Ned: A personal view of the correspondence bias. In J. M. Darley & J. Cooper (Eds.), Attribution and social interaction: The legacy of E. E. Jones. Washington, DC: APA Press. PDF.
- Gilbert, D. T. (Ed.). (2004). The Selected Works of Edward E. Jones. ISBN 0-471-19226-0
- Harvey, J., Ickes, W., & Kidd, R., "A conversation with Edward E. Jones and Harold H. Kelley", In J. Harvey, W. Ickes, and R. Kidd (Eds.), New Directions in Attribution Research, Vol. 2 (pp. 371–388). Hillsdale, NJ: Erlbaum., 1978.
