= Parenting styles' influence on attribution bias =

Parenting styles affect the ways in which their children, in later life, evaluate or try to find reasons for their own and others' behaviors (attribution bias). Parenting styles, the various methods and beliefs about childrearing parents or guardians employ to socialise their children, differentiated by differing levels of warmth and discipline, have been linked to various developmental outcomes, including the formation of attribution biases. Attribution in psychology involves the subjective interpretation of others' intentions and actions, acting as a mechanism for individuals to draw patterns and connections from many social contexts. Strong connections have been made between parenting styles like authoritarian parenting, and the increased likelihood of developing forms of hostile attribution bias.

The interaction of parenting styles and attribution biases demonstrates the interconnectivity of an individual's environment and self-perception. Parenting models affect the development of cognitive schemas, influencing how individuals process social information. For instance, schemas can influence how an individual rationalises others' actions, attributing them to external situations or internal dispositions.

Cultural and socioeconomic factors may further influence this dynamic interaction, so the interplay must be observed in a broader context. Reviewing the effect of parenting on forms of attribution biases may have diverse implications on the development of social theories, and clinical practices, presenting the opportunity to identify maladaptive cognitive strategies that some parenting styles may trigger.

== Parenting styles ==
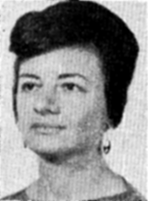
Diana Baumrind, Developmental psychologist

Parenting styles are grouped into four categories- authoritarian, authoritative, permissive and neglectful, each impacting how individuals perceive others and their surroundings. Developed in the 1960s by psychologist Diana Baumrind, it was argued that parents shape the frequency and type of stimuli the child is exposed to, inevitably impacting their child's personality and perception of their surroundings. The typology classifies parenting through traits like demandingness and responsiveness, exploring effects on the child's overall development. Additional research in the 1980s by Eleanor E. Maccoby and James A. Martin introduced neglectful parenting. Improving the comprehensiveness of the two-dimensional model, the expansion explored low warmth in parenting, gaining a wider perspective of the long-term consequences of both normal variations and abusive parenting.

Authoritarian parenting emphasises high demandingness with low warmth. It enforces strict rules, resulting in high personal standards, but creates an over-dependency on structured routines. Fearing the consequences of disobeyment, individuals commonly struggle with autonomous tasks, as there is little thought about how their behaviour aligns with their intrinsic beliefs. This style also correlates with low self-esteem and a weak self-image.

Permissive parenting adopts a friendly and lenient approach, prioritising responsiveness. This can instil high implicit self-esteem but leads to difficulty processing criticism or accountability for actions. Children raised this way may struggle with decision-making from self-guiding their behaviour in childhood and may lack respect for authority.

Authoritative styles are believed to be most beneficial for child development, balancing high responsiveness and demandingness. Fostering independence and self-reliance throughout adulthood, the style encourages the child to create rationale behind their parents' expectations of behaviour, building a strong self-perception and self-esteem. Investigation into life satisfaction scores in adulthood reveals higher ratings compared to other styles, showing there is empirical evidence from a large sample that this approach can lead to a successful outcome.

Neglectful parenting, demonstrated by low warmth and expectations has profound negative effects like emotional detachment, limited self-enhancement and negative self-perception. Findings show it reinforces a passive mentality and maladaptive strategies in children, exposing them to attachment and trust issues. Overall, individuals develop a lack of self-discipline and responsibility for actions; however, other stressors with this parenting style, like abuse and poverty, are common, making the attribution of outcomes solely to parenting difficult.

Despite examining parenting as a powerful predictor of processing social information and perception, other factors like individual temperament and the social environment are important to analyse, to achieve a comprehensive overview of factors shaping an individual's self-representation and perception.

== Attribution bias ==
The Attribution theory originated in the 1950s under Heider's 'naïve psychology', explaining how people identify the causes of events. Contemporarily, it helps describe frameworks used to evaluate others' motives for their actions. Attribution theory structures disorganised information about people or groups to anticipate future actions. It is considered a cognitive mechanism, integrating schemas and internal frameworks to understand social interactions whilst avoiding cognitive overload.

This research inspired theories on cognitive errors, like the correspondent inference theory, which states that individuals search to determine if behaviour corresponds to internal dispositions, like personality, or external circumstances to find the reasoning behind their intentions. Social desirability related to the behaviour is also analysed when forming this judgement. Research revealed that weaker situational forces surrounding behaviour led to greater internal dispositional attribution, whereas stronger forces, emphasised external situational factors.

A related concept is the self-serving bias, introduced by Miller and Ross in the 1970s. This bias explains how individuals emphasise personal responsibility for success while deflecting blame during failure, relating to humans' egotistical nature. Studies on returns of virtual stock-market investments showed participants attributed negative results to external factors like market conditions, whilst explaining gains through internal traits like intelligence. Despite the cultural limitations, thus the generalisability of findings of this example, it still illustrates the process of cognitive errors, which can be applied to social interactions where individuals favour ingroups over outgroups.

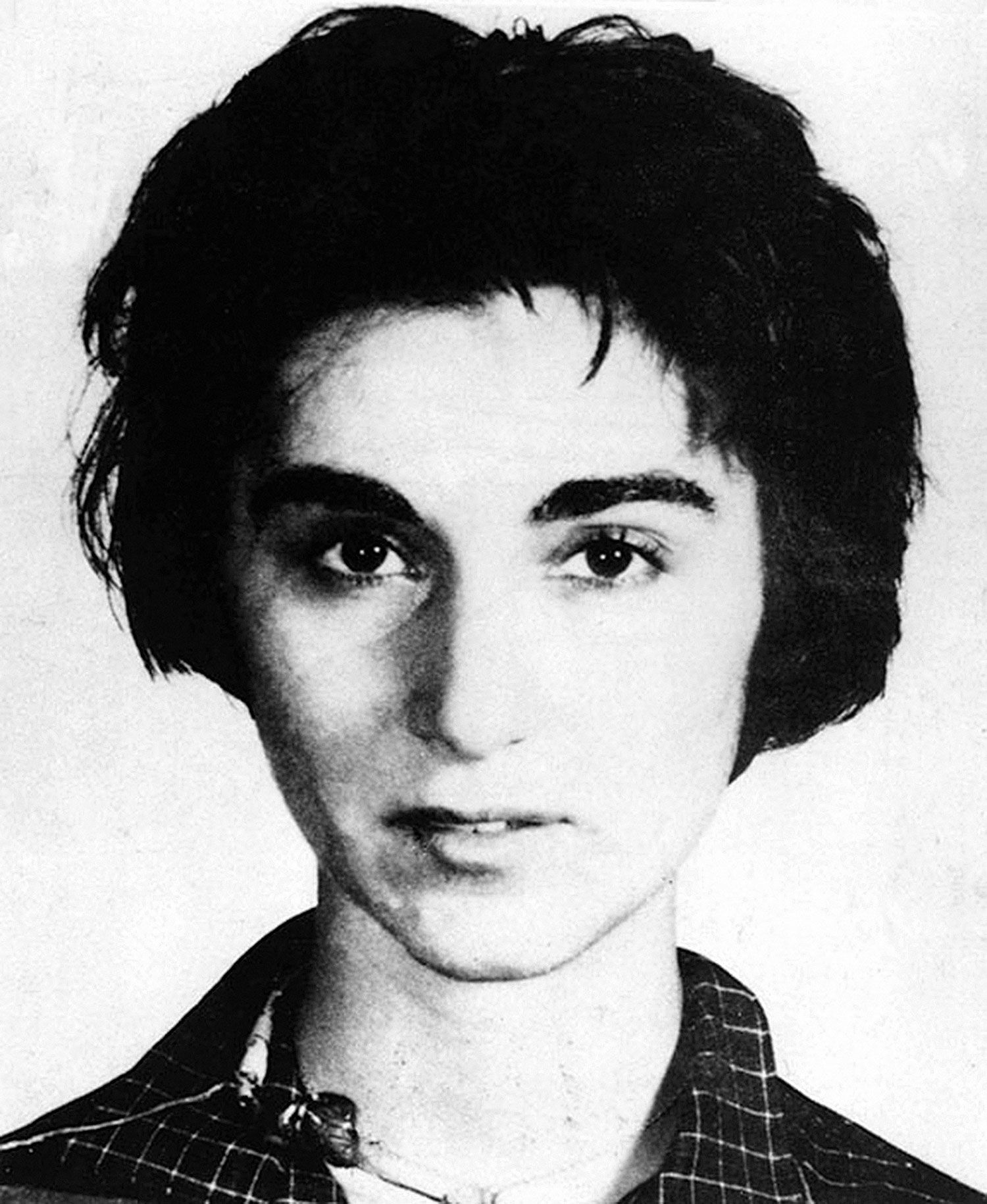
Kitty Genovese, before her murder in 1964

Another observed effect is the actor-observer bias, which implies that individuals attribute others' actions to personality traits but their own to situational factors. A subtype of fundamental attribution error, actors of behaviour consider external surroundings, while observers focus on internal traits. The murder of Kitty Genovese illustrates this as, although witnesses expressed apathy, their lack of intervention was explained by fear of personal risk. Some believed that the ambiguity of the situation explained the bias; others argued that social attitudes surrounding sexism in 1960s America influenced interpretations. This bias highlights differences between internal perspectives and interpreting visible actions, describing the potential for social misunderstandings.

Overall, it is important to consider the explanation behind the initial development of attribution tendencies in individuals and the factors that shape this; namely the environment which is evident that both cognitive and motivational mechanisms. Ultimately, the development of attribution tendencies stems from environmental and cognitive factors and is strongly determined by the perceived motivation of others.

== Parenting styles and attribution bias ==
Within psychology, there is a substantial gap in the literature explaining the relationship between parenting and the formation of attribution bias. This is despite abundant research suggesting the importance of parental influence on various cognitive mechanisms and social development, as they act as underlying systems generating these biases from how others' behaviours are interpreted.

Authoritative styles are associated with positive developmental outcomes of attribution in may studies. When applying qualities that are encouraged by this style, like reflection on rules given by authority, it shows that the balance of the two-dimensional model promotes emotional regulation and self-autonomy, resulting in the child understanding that their behaviour can be attributed to both a person's disposition, but also a situation. This means children recognise the potential for people to change and even learn from their actions. Overall, teaching skills like resilience and critical thinking in childhood can promote the analysis of balanced attributions in ambiguous situations, as the individual has learnt to account for multiple perspectives behind the situation, making them less likely to fall victim to fundamental attribution biases.

Authoritarianism presents a varying outcome. When analysing the general executive functioning that this style instils, the lower levels of warmth often create highly reactive behaviours within the individual. Due to the unregulated reactions to behaviours parents elicit, emotional problems can arise which when applied to interpreting others' behaviour can lead to the formation of a hostile attribution bias. This is because of the abundance of negative connections that were made to their behaviour in childhood, resulting in the learnt schema of the individual tending to interpret ambiguous situations or behaviour as negative also. Parenting that emphasises self-serving principles, like expecting hard work to lead to positive outcomes, can shape a child's way of thinking when evaluating behaviour.

Permissive parenting often correlates to the formation of actor-observer bias as children are not held accountable for their actions, leading to the appointment of reasoning to external factors. The lack of exposure to negative emotions in childhood further promotes a lack of accountability for actions as the individual has learnt to interpret behaviour in a way that best protects self-esteem, leading to the attribution being based on others' personality traits rather than their involvement.

There is extensive evidence to suggest that neglectful parenting can have a profound impact on developing many forms of attribution biases. Issues with trust and attachment lead to a negative bias through the constant reinforcement of self-blame in childhood, and attributions to internal factors. This further impacts the development of the self-serving bias, contributing to a feeling of failure rather than understanding the impacts of dispositional factors in poorer outcomes, and lack of attribution to themselves in successful situations.

== Cultural and wider contexts ==
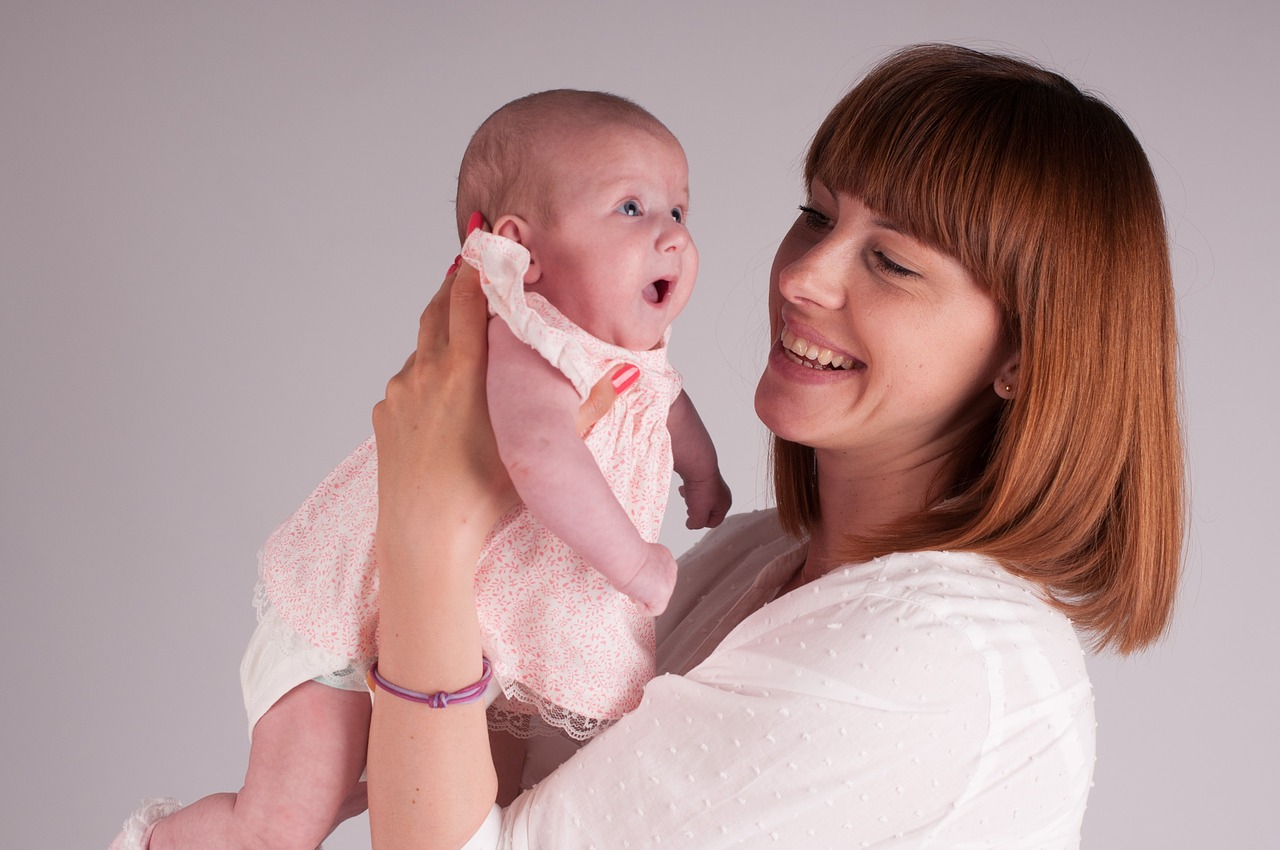
Mother holding infant

Cultural application of this concept is vital, as values and norms or the environment may also influence parenting, affecting the outcome of attribution errors.

An important factor is the broader setting of individual experiences. Baumrind's research correlates neglectful parenting styles that relinquish control, to the child's more progressive need for peer approval. If there is a lack of feedback on ambiguous behaviour or situations throughout childhood, mental frameworks and social schemas may not fully develop. This can lead to an overreliance on cultural norms to fill in the gaps in understanding others' intentions, highlighting its importance as a factor.

Within collectivist cultures like Eastern Asia, authoritarian and authoritative parenting best aligns with community values of harmony and interdependence. Parenting reflects this by instilling a strong sense of rules and discipline in community settings, reflecting the hierarchal structure of the family and obeyment of authority. This contrasts individualistic settings like Western Europe, where authoritative and permissive models focus on personal achievement and autonomy. These styles account for freedom of choice and self-direction to align with the structure of democracy. Collectivists prefer to externalise attributions, and individualists tend to define behaviour by individual traits, resulting in this group having stronger self-serving bias tendencies and more negative attributions.

Socioeconomic status (SES) may also determine the opportunities and situations a child is exposed to, hinting at the outcome of their cognitive development. Research supports the statement that a higher SES correlates to authoritative styles, and low to authoritarian or permissive. Variations in this caused by the ability of the parents to spend time with the child, as well as the opportunity to engage in positive parenting practices, can alter how that individual will act when faced with similar situations in the future. For example, in a low SES household, there is a link to lower cognitive functioning in adulthood, the additional stress of providing an income may reduce the chance for the parent to engage with their child and coach them through ambiguous situations when attribution biases may form, so despite their parenting style, the lack of frequent proximity may have a further impact on what the child internalises, especially if there are multiple role models. However, the influence of culture is confusing, with multiple colluding factors, thus demanding it to be viewed as a holistic impact.

== Limitations and implications in the psychological community ==
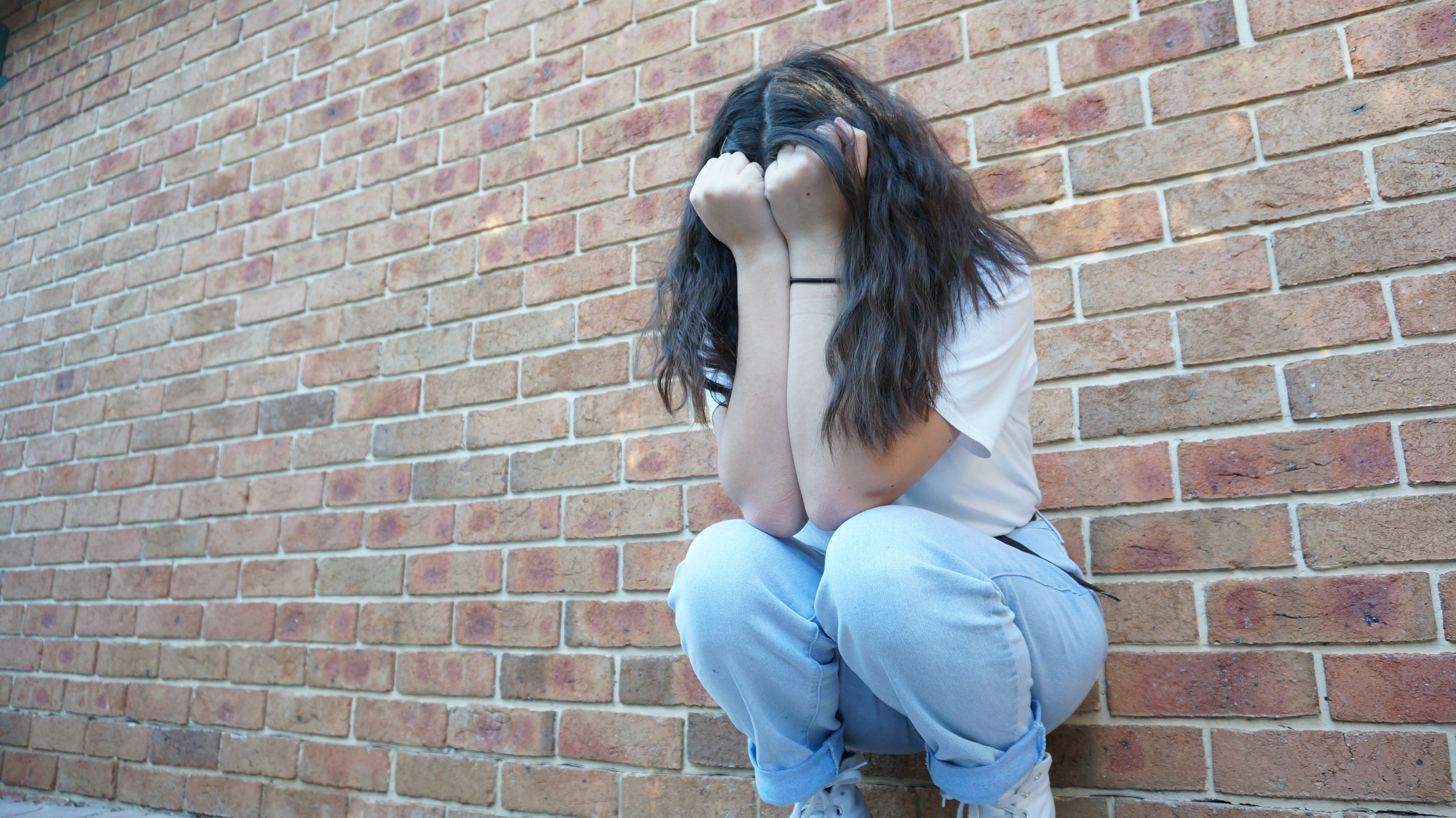
Depressed adolescent

The concept of cultural validity highlights a limitation in Baumrind's model of parenting styles, as this is described as a universal categorisation despite there being fundamental differences in cultural practices. The modern approach to understanding cultural variation describes a gradual, 'domain-specific' model of differences rather than a universal law. This challenges the generalisability of current findings, particularly when certain styles are labelled as good or bad despite their application within a cultural context. For instance, authoritarian parenting is criticised for instilling maladaptive cognitive strategies like these biases but may provide an additional protective factor for survival.

Furthermore, the development of attribution biases like the self-serving bias may not be fully explained by parenting style alone. Other factors like the individual's temperament, biological predispositions or psychological disorders may also play a role, further complicating the link between parenting styles and cognitive outcomes. Development of attributions is a dynamic process, with interactions outside the household like peer relationships, complicating the measurement of the parental effect, particularly in adolescent rearing. Additionally, research suggests that forms of traumatic brain injuries (TBI) increase the negative evaluations of ambiguous situations, implying that physiological brain structures may be important. The correlational nature of this relationship raises difficulty in isolating the effects of parenting from other confounding variables.

Despite these limitations, understanding the impacts of parenting on social and cognitive outcomes remains important. Longitudinal studies with a large and diverse sample may be able to further explore the extent of this interplay. For example, investigating the reinforcement of low self-worth in some styles could help strengthen the insight into parenting's contribution to psychological disorders like depression. Links from this further research will benefit numerous stakeholders like educators, who can identify these potential risk factors, and clinical psychologists, who could develop interventions targeted at preventing the future onset of disorders. Applying the findings of parent-child interactions to broader developmental frameworks and perceptions of the social environment can overall promote well-being across a diverse range of populations.
