= Psi Chi =

College student honor society in psychology

- ΨΧ
- Founded: 1929; 97 years ago University of Kansas
- Type: Honor
- Affiliation: ACHS
- Status: Active
- Emphasis: Psychology
- Scope: International
- Colors: Platinum and Dark Blue
- Publication: Psi Chi Journal; Eye on Psi Chi
- Chapters: 1,100+
- Members: 900,000+ lifetime
- Headquarters: 808 Chestnut St PMB 55; Chattanooga, Tennessee 37402; United States
- Website: psichi.org

Psi Chi (ΨΧ) is a college student honor society in psychology with international outreach founded in 1929 at the University of Kansas in the United States.

Psi Chi is one of the largest honor societies in the United States, with more than 1,100 chapters. Psi Chi has more than 900,000 members from chapters in the United States, Canada, and multiple other countries. Notable members of the organization include B.F. Skinner, Philip Zimbardo, and Albert Bandura.

Psi Chi is a member of the Association of College Honor Societies and is an affiliate of the American Psychological Association and the Association for Psychological Science.

== Founding ==
Psi Chi was founded by Frederick Howell Lewis and Edwin B. Newman, psychology students at the University of Kansas. Lewis and Newman first thought of a national organization for psychology students while working on research late one night in 1927. Over the next two years, they wrote to psychology faculty and students at various universities and formed discussion groups with other students. Psi Chi's first official meeting was on September 4, 1929, at the Ninth International Congress of Psychology. Psi Chi's original name was Sigma Pi Sigma, but it was learned that the name was already in use by an honor society in physics. "Psi Chi" was chosen as the honor society's official name at its second annual meeting in 1930 because of the name's similarity to the word "psychology".

During his tenure as President from 2006 to 2007, John M. Davis advocated that Psi Chi become an international society. He proposed ten amendments to Psi Chi's constitution that would transform the organization from a national to international society. The Psi Chi National Council approved all the amendments in August 2008, and a national vote by all of the Psi Chi chapters then ratified the amendments in April 2009.

== Membership ==
Membership is open to undergraduate, graduate, alumni, and faculty members who make the study of psychology one of their major interests and who meet the minimum qualifications according to Psi Chi's Become a Member webpage, which is based on the Society's Constitution. Membership is attained through application and acceptance at the local chapter level. Psychology majors who attend two-year junior or community colleges may join Psi Beta, Psi Chi's sister society.

A 2006 survey found that around 43% of Psi Chi alumni were enrolled in graduate programs, with most enrolled in a masters instead of a doctoral program. Around 57.7% of respondents also stated they were employed full-time since graduation; the most frequent occupations reported were education (24.6%), corporate settings (22.4%), non-profit settings (19.8%), and community/social service agencies (16.2%).

== Awards and grants ==
Psi Chi rewards its members annually with over $400,000 in various awards and grants programs. In addition to awards and grants, Psi Chi began its first scholarship program in the spring of 2015. Undergraduate and graduate scholarships are now available.

== Publications ==
=== Psi Chi Journal of Psychological Research ===
Psi Chi publishes a quarterly peer-reviewed journal named the Psi Chi Journal of Psychological Research. The journal features original research conducted by undergraduates, graduate students, and faculty mentors. To increase dissemination across the psychological community, all articles are available free online. The journal is indexed in EBSCO, and in PsycINFO, a database service of the American Psychological Association with over 3 million records of peer-reviewed scholarly literature.

=== Eye on Psi Chi ===
Psi Chi publishes a quarterly magazine called Eye on Psi Chi, which features career and graduate school advice, updates in popular areas of psychology, and special announcements to keep readers connected with the organization. Notable authors and distinguished interviews include Robert Sternberg, Susan Fiske, Anthony Greenwald, Florence Denmark, Peter Gray, John C. Norcross, and Phillip Zimbardo. All Eye articles are available free online.

== Activities ==
Psi Chi members may attend national and regional conventions, held yearly. Some chapters provide information on graduate study in psychology and assist members in the graduate school application process. Tutoring, community service, and social events are also common activities of Psi Chi chapters.

== Structure and governance ==
Psi Chi, a federally recognized, tax-exempt 501(c)(3) nonprofit organization, is governed by the board of directors. The board of directors is composed of three presidents (President, President-Elect, Past-President), six regional vice-presidents (East, Midwest, Rocky Mountain, Southeast, Southwest, West), and an executive director. The presidents and regional vice-presidents are elected by Psi Chi chapters.

Regional vice-presidents serve two-year terms and may serve up to a total of two consecutive terms (four years). Regional vice-president elections are held in odd-numbered years for the Eastern, Rocky Mountain, and Western Regions, and in even-numbered years for the Midwestern, Southeastern, and Southwestern Regions.

President candidates must have served at least one full two-year term as a regional vice-president. If elected by chapters to become president, the candidate becomes the Society's President-Elect for one year, President the following year, and then the Past-President the year after.

== Headquarters ==
The Psi Chi Headquarters fulfills the needs of the society as directed by the leadership of the board of directors. Headquarters staff are composed of an executive director, director of membership and development, director of communications, director of finance, and director of information systems. As needed, the board of directors creates new staff positions to help better meet the needs of and provide benefits to members of the society.

The title of the "executive director" position has changed over the years: secretary-treasurer (1929–54), executive secretary (1954–68), executive director (1969–91), executive officer (1991–2003), chief operating officer (2004–present).

=== Executive directors ===
Ruth Hubbard Cousins (born May 21, 1920) was one of the society's most famous executive directors, serving for more than 33 years (December 1958 – October 1991). Under her leadership, Psi Chi became an official affiliate of the American Psychological Association in 1958, as well as a member of the Association of College Honor Societies in 1965. She died on January 11, 2007.

After Cousins retired as executive director, Kay Wilson (born September 21, 1939) took over as executive officer (the title changed, but her position still functioned as executive director) from October 1991 until her death in June 2003, of cancer.

When Kay Wilson died in 2003, the national council reviewed the position of executive officer and decided to split the position's function into two positions: "rector" (a new position with broader outreach and strategic planning functions) and "executive officer" (the position with office management functions that had been in place since the beginning). A search began in 2003, and Virginia Andreoli Mathie, who had been a professor of psychology at James Madison University (Virginia), was hired as the first executive director in the newly created position. She began on July 1, 2004, and served until June 30, 2008. Dr. Mathie was responsible for coordinating with other psychological organizations, long-term strategic planning, and assisting universities applying for a Psi Chi chapter.

Beginning July 1, 2008, Martha S. Zlokovich, from Southeast Missouri State University and a former Psi Chi national president, began serving as Psi Chi's second executive director. Dr. Zlokovich served for 15 years until her retirement.

Psi Chi's third executive director, Dr. Marianne Fallon, began on August 1, 2023.

Paula Miller, who was the organization's previous membership and awards director (1997–2003), was hired as the executive officer in 2003, and served in that position managing the Psi Chi Headquarters in Chattanooga, TN until 2007. In March 2007, Lisa Mantooth, formerly of the Cleveland, Tennessee, Red Cross Chapter, began as executive officer and served through November 2009.

In 2010, Michele Rumpf continued in the executive officer role but the title changed to Chief Operating Officer. She served until 2015. Martha S. Zlokovich, PhD, was named interim chief operating officer in the fall of 2015.

== Notable members ==
- George Albee
- Drew Appleby
- Mahzarin Banaji
- Albert Bandura
- Guillermo Bernal
- William Bevan
- Jerome S. Bruner
- John Cacioppo
- Stephen L. Chew
- Robert Cialdini
- Stuart W. Cook
- Florence Denmark
- Alice Eagly
- John E. Edlund
- Raymond D. Fowler
- Florence Goodenough
- J. P. Guilford
- Ruth B. Guilford
- Jane Halonen
- Diane Halpern
- Paul Hettich
- Mark Leary
- Frederick H. Lewis
- Elizabeth Loftus
- Nadine Kaslow
- Otto Klineberg
- Virginia Andreoli Mathie
- Rollo May
- Neal Miller
- Edwin B. Newman
- John Norcross
- John Popplestone
- Antonio Puente
- Robert Rosenthal
- Duane Rumbaugh
- Daniel Schacter
- Mahlon Brewster Smith
- B.F. Skinner
- Charles Spielberger
- Claude Steele
- Robert Sternberg
- Harold Takooshian
- Melba J. T. Vasquez
- Michael Wertheimer
- Susan Krauss Whitbourne
- Joseph Wolpe
- Philip Zimbardo
- Martha S. Zlokovich
