= Eye on Psi Chi =

American honor society magazine

- Editor: Susan Iles
- Categories: Psychology
- Frequency: Quarterly
- First issue: 1996
- Company: Psi Chi
- Country: United States
- Language: English
- Website: www.psichi.org
- ISSN: 1092-0803 (print); 2164-9812 (web)

Eye on Psi Chi is the official magazine of Psi Chi, the International Honor Society in Psychology. This quarterly publication contains features, columns, interviews, and special announcements about popular advancements and issues in the field of psychology, as well as professional development, career, and graduate school advice. Eye on Psi Chi also updates members, alumni, and nonmembers regarding Psi Chi programs, financial opportunities, and chapter activities. Complete submission instructions can be found on Psi Chi's website.

All articles are available free online, including past issues dating back to the magazine's first issue in Fall 1996. Individuals can search for articles by category or author using Psi Chi's Publications Search tool. Notable authors and distinguished interviews include Robert Sternberg, Susan Fiske, Anthony Greenwald, Florence Denmark, and Phillip Zimbardo.

Psi Chi's other official publication is the Psi Chi Journal of Psychological Research, a fully peer-reviewed journal for original empirical research conducted by Psi Chi undergraduates, graduate students, and faculty members.
