= Correspondent inference theory =

Psychological theory

Correspondent inference theory is a psychological theory proposed by Edward E. Jones and Keith E. Davis (1965) that "systematically accounts for a perceiver's inferences about what an actor was trying to achieve by a particular action". The purpose of this theory is to explain why people make internal or external attributions. People compare their actions with alternative actions to evaluate the choices that they have made, and by looking at various factors they can decide if their behaviour was caused by an internal disposition. The covariation model is used within this, more specifically that the degree in which one attributes behavior to the person as opposed to the situation. These factors are the following: does the person have a choice in the partaking in the action, is their behavior expected by their social role, and is their behavior consequence of their normal behavior?

== Non-common effects ==
The consequences of a chosen action must be compared with the consequences of possible alternative actions. The fewer effects the possible choices have in common, the more confident one can be in inferring a correspondent disposition. Or, put another way, the more distinctive the consequences of a choice, the more confidently one can infer intention and disposition.

Suppose a student is planning to go on a postgraduate course, and they short-list two colleges – University College London and the London School of Economics. They choose UCL rather than the LSE. What can the social perceiver learn from this? First, there are a lot of common effects – urban environment, same distance from home, same exam system, similar academic reputation, etc. These common effects do not provide the perceiver with any clues about their motivation. But if the perceiver believes that UCL has better sports facilities, or easier access to the University Library, then these non-common or unique effects which can provide a clue to their motivation. But, suppose they had short-listed UCL and University of Essex and they choose UCL. Now the perceiver is faced with a number of non-common effects; size of city; distance from home; academic reputation; exam system. The perceiver would then be much less confident about inferring a particular intention or disposition when there are a lot of non-common effects. The fewer the non-common effects, the more certain the attribution of intent.

== Low-social desirability ==
People usually intend socially desirable outcomes, hence socially desirable outcomes are not informative about a person's intention or disposition. The most that someone can infer is that the person is normal – which is not saying anything very much. But socially undesirable actions are more informative about intentions and dispositions. Suppose a person asked a friend for a loan of £1 and it was given (a socially desirable action) – the perceiver couldn't say a great deal about their friend's kindness or helpfulness because most people would have done the same thing. If, on the other hand, the friend refused to lend them the money (a socially undesirable action), the perceiver might well feel that their friend is rather stingy, or even miserly.

In fact, social desirability – although an important influence on behaviour – is really only a special case of the more general principle that behaviour which deviates from the normal, usual, or expected is more informative about a person's disposition than behaviour that conforms to the normal, usual, or expected. So, for example, when people do not conform to group pressure we can be more certain that they truly believe the views they express than people who conform to the group. Similarly, when people in a particular social role (e.g. doctor, teacher, salesperson, etc.) behave in ways that are not in keeping with the role demands, we can be more certain about what they are really like than when people behave in role.

== Expectancies ==
Only behaviours that disconfirm expectancies are truly informative about an actor. There are two types of expectancy. Category-based expectancies are those derived from our knowledge about particular types or groups of people. For example, if an individual were surprised to hear a wealthy businessman extolling the virtues of socialism, their surprise would rest on the expectation that businessmen (a category of people) are not usually socialist.

Target-based expectancies derive from knowledge about a particular person. To know that a person is a supporter of Margaret Thatcher sets up certain expectations and associations about their beliefs and character.

== Choice ==
Another factor in inferring a disposition from an action is whether the behaviour of the actor is constrained by situational forces or whether it occurs from the actor's choice. If a student were assigned to argue a position in a classroom debate (e.g. for or against Neoliberalism), it would be unwise of their audience to infer that their statements in the debate reflect their true beliefs – because they did not choose to argue that particular side of the issue. If, however, they had chosen to argue one side of the issue, then it would be appropriate for the audience to conclude that their statements reflect their true beliefs.

Although choice ought to have an important effect on whether or not people make correspondent inferences, research shows that people do not take choice sufficiently into account when judging another person's attributes or attitudes. There is a tendency for perceivers to assume that when an actor engages in an activity, such as stating a point of view or attitude, the statements made are indicative of the actor's true beliefs, even when there may be clear situational forces affecting the behaviour. In fact, earlier, psychologists had foreseen that something like this would occur; they thought that the actor-act relation was so strong – like a perceptual Gestalt – that people would tend to over-attribute actions to the actor even when there are powerful external forces on the actor that could account for the behaviour.

== Hedonic Relevance ==
Hedonic relevance (also known as hedonistic relevance) is the tendency to attribute a behavior to dispositional factors rather than situational factors if the observed person’s behavior appears to be directly intended to benefit or harm us, or has such results. For example, Ali studied hard but still failed his maths test. His mother attributed the failure to Ali's laziness and got upset, but neglected to consider the fact that the test paper was tough. This is because Ali's mother considers his school results to be of personal relevance to her. If Ali's friend had failed the exam, she would be more likely to attribute the failure to situational factors, e.g., the test's difficulty.

== Personalism ==
We tend to 'take it personally', when someone accidentally did something that can negatively impact us, we tend to think that the behaviour was personal and intended, although it was in fact just an accident. For example, when we had a group study, Ali spilled his coffee on Abu's papers. Abu thought that Ali did it on purpose to disturb his revision so that Abu can outscore him. But in fact he had no such intention and it was just an accident.

== See also ==
- Attribution theory
- Revealed preferences
