= John Dashiell =

American psychologist

- Born: April 30, 1888; Southport, Indiana
- Died: May 3, 1975 (aged 87)
- Known for: Past president, American Psychological Association
- Scientific career
- Fields: Psychology
- Institutions: University of North Carolina, University of Minnesota
- Doctoral advisor: John Dewey; James McKeen Cattell

John Frederick Dashiell (April 30, 1888 – May 3, 1975) was an American psychologist and a past president of the American Psychological Association.

== Biography ==
Dashiell was born in 1888 in Southport, Indiana. Early in his career, Dashiell taught at Waynesburg College, Princeton University, University of Minnesota and Oberlin College.

Dashiell became a department head at the University of North Carolina. He was an APA president in 1938. In his presidential address that year, he called for psychology to reconnect with philosophy for its methodology and logic. He was president of the Society for the Teaching of Psychology in 1953–1954.
