= Ruth Hubbard Cousins =

American psychologist

- Born: June 21, 1920; Waleska, Georgia, U.S.
- Died: January 11, 2007 (aged 86); Chattanooga, Tennessee, U.S.
- Education: City College of New York, George Washington University and American University
- Known for: Psi Chi; Psi Beta

Ruth Hubbard Cousins (May 21, 1920 – January 11, 2007) was an American psychologist, best known for her influence in shaping Psi Chi as Executive Secretary and Executive Director from December 1958 to October 1991. In addition Cousins worked with her daughter Carol Tracy to help co-found another psychology honor society, Psi Beta in 1981.

== Early life ==
Ruth Hubbard Cousins was born on May 21, 1920, in Waleska, Georgia, and was one of six children of Charles Turner Hubbard and Frances Boston Hubbard. Both of her parents were teachers: Frances Hubbard was an elementary school teacher and Charles Hubbard taught physics at a local college. After her family's house burned down when Cousins was a baby, her family decided to move to Tifton, Georgia. Around this time her father changed careers, working with a team in Miami, Florida, as a construction contractor.

=== Education ===
Cousins moved to New York City after high school and attended the City College of New York. While there she met her future husband James Franklin Cousins, an economics major at Duke University. The couple met at the Grace Methodist Church on Park Avenue in 1941, and one year later were married there. After graduating from Duke University, James Cousins worked for a Certified Public Accountant certificate. The couple lived together in New York while James was in the Law program at Columbia University. During this time, their first daughter Carol Cousins was born. Around the time that the USA entered World War II, the family moved to Washington, D.C., after James received his orders to report for duty as a naval officer. After he was deployed overseas, Cousins and her daughter Carol moved in with her parents in Georgia. They remained in Georgia for about three years until James returned home from the war. James received an offer of an administrative post at Duke University, the family moved to Durham, North Carolina, and nine months later their second daughter Joan Cousins was born.

The family moved again in 1953, to Arlington County, Virginia, after James received an offer for a job at the National Automobile Dealers Association. After this move Cousins started to attend George Washington University with the desire to take a child psychology course. In order to take this course though Cousins needed to take an introductory psychology course. The professor of Cousins' introductory course for Psychology, Eva Johnson, was the person who later convinced Cousins to go work for Psi Chi. Cousins completed her bachelor's degree and Graduate degree in 1963 for Psychology at George Washington University.

== Psi Chi ==
In 1958, while working towards her bachelor's degree, Cousins was approached by Dr. Eva Johnson. Johnson wanted Cousins to take on the position of Executive Secretary-Treasurer, at Psi Chi the National Honor Society in Psychology. The name of the position was later changed from Executive Secretary-Treasurer to Executive Secretary. Since she was still a student Cousins originally only planned to stay one year at Psi Chi in order to help the society to regain a solid standing. During the year she was there, James also helped to support Psi Chi with his business and non-profit knowledge. It was James who helped establish a solid bookkeeping system for Psi Chi. James died from appendicitis complications in September 1959, as a result of his death Cousins decided to stay on as Executive Secretary at Psi Chi. Cousins devoted her energy towards Psi Chi and recruited her daughters Carol and Joan Cousins to help with various Psi Chi duties such as typing, mailing and filing.

=== Changing Psi Chi's status ===
Following her decision to stay with Psi Chi, Cousins worked to help institute many changes to the organization. One of the changes Cousins helped to implement was to change Psi Chi's status as an honorary society to that of an honor society. Cousins started working for this change after the head office received a question from one of the Midwest Psi Chi chapters asking what their registration fee for Psi Chi afforded them. As an honorary society, all a Psi Chi officer at the main office could offer them was to store the chapter's membership records. Cousins desire to take the steps necessary to turn Psi Chi into an honor Society was not realized until Wayne Dennis became the Psi Chi President in 1961. With Dennis' support, Cousins was able to move forward with this plan and in 1965, Psi Chi became an official honor society. As a result, Psi Chi was allowed to affiliate with Association of College Honor Societies (ACHS). This change allowed potential members to apply to Psi Chi based on their credentials instead of through invitation and voting from their chapters.

=== Psi Chi speakers ===
Cousins was the one who put forth the proposal to start inviting distinguished speakers to give talks for Psi Chi sponsored programs in 1962. One of goals Cousins had for Psi Chi was to create more programs to increase student involvement in Psychology. One of the first individuals Cousins invited was Harvard professor Edwin G. Boring, a critic of Psi Chi who had been against its founding. After Boring accepted the invitation to talk he changed his views and became an avid supporter of Psi Chi throughout the rest of his life. Over the years many psychologists have come given talks for Psi Chi, including B. F. Skinner, who accepted Psi Chi's invitation to speak six different times.

=== Moving locations ===
Throughout the time she worked there, Cousins helped to oversee the move of Psi Chi's offices in 1964, 1980 and 1987. The move in 1964, was to the attic space of the American Psychological Association's building on 16th street in Washington, D.C. This move marked the first time there was adequate space for the Executive Secretary and one other staff member. Before this move, Cousins and her staff had operated the central office of Psi Chi out of Cousins' own home. During January 1980, Psi Chi left the American Psychological Association (APA)'s space in Washington, D.C., to another of the APA's buildings in Arlington, Virginia. Psi Chi ended up needing to move again just a few years later in 1987 after the building they were working in was condemned. Finally Psi Chi moved to Chattanooga, Tennessee, to share a building with the newly formed Psi Beta and this became the permanent location of Psi Chi central office.

== Psi Beta ==
During the time that Cousins worked at Psi Chi, she received letters from professors at two year colleges who wanted a two-year psychology honor society. After searching in vain for someone to start this new honor society, Cousins turned to her daughter Carol Tracy and convinced her to help found it. Psi Beta, the National Honor society in Psychology for Community and Junior Colleges was founded in 1981 by Ruth Hubbard Cousins and Carol Tracy in Chattanooga, Tennessee. In November 1987, at the advice of the current Psi Chi president Virginia sexton, Cousins oversaw the move of Psi Chi to Chattanooga, Tennessee in order to share a location with Psi Beta. This move allowed Psi Beta to grow and allowed Psi Chi to avoid spending too much of their finances. A few years later Psi Beta became the first two-year college honor society accepted into the Association of College Honor Societies.

== Retirement ==
After three decades worth of service, Ruth Hubbard Cousins resigned from her position as Executive Director for Psi Chi in October 1991. Her departure was monumental enough that preparations for her departure began a year in advance. After her retirement in 1991, Cousins spent her time exploring her interests in history and genealogy and as a result joined the Daughters of the American Revolution. During this period of time Cousins also conducted 52 interviews with World War II veterans living in Tennessee and created an oral history project that is now stored in the Library of Congress. At the age of 86 and dealing with Alzheimer's Ruth Hubbard Cousins died on Thursday January 11, 2007, at Erlanger Hospital in Chattanooga, Tennessee. Cousins was buried beside her husband James F. Cousins on February 5, 2007, in the Arlington National Cemetery.

== Legacy ==
Ruth Hubbard Cousins helped to shape Psi Chi into the thriving organization it is today by working to increase the amount of student involvement in both Psi Chi and the Psychology major field. Following the work her late husband started, Cousins with the combined effort of the National Council helped Psi Chi achieve a monetary surplus in the late 1980s. She helped to expand the number of chapters and chapter locations, as well as increase the number of life members. When she arrived Psi Chi had 25,000 members spread across 130 chapters and she expanded it to 221,573 members from 734 chapters. Under Cousin's guidance Psi Chi has become the largest group affiliated with Association of College Honor Societies (ACHS). Along with these achievements she became one of the first women to serve on the Society of Association Executives board in Washington, D.C. In 1991, the American Psychological Association awarded Cousins with the first ever honorary lifetime membership. In 2001, the American Psychological Association presented to Cousins the APA Presidential Citation, in honor of all the work she had done for Psychology.
