= Susan A. Nolan =

American psychologist

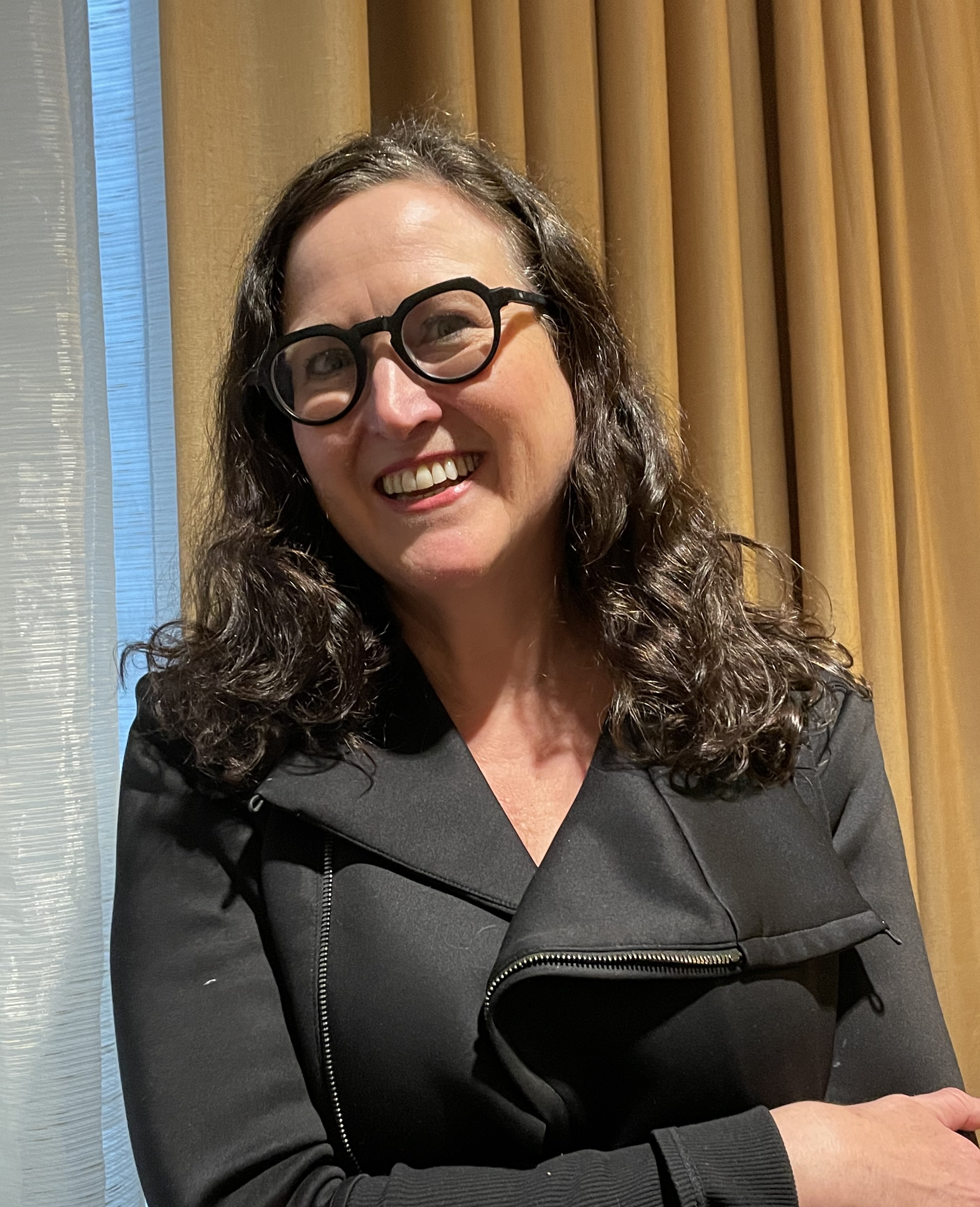
- Nolan in 2024
- Education: College of the Holy Cross (BA); Northwestern University (MS, PhD)
- Occupations: Professor, editor
- Awards: Fukuhara Award for International Research and Service (2020)
- Scientific career
- Fields: Clinical psychology
- Workplaces: Seton Hall University; Eastern Psychological Association; Society for the Teaching of Psychology
- Thesis: Verbal, nonverbal, and gender-related factors in negative interpersonal reactions toward depressed and anxious individuals

Susan Alice Nolan is an American clinical psychologist. She studies critical thinking, assessment in higher education, mental health, and gender disparities in STEM fields. She is a professor of psychology at Seton Hall University.

Nolan was the president of the Society for the Teaching of Psychology in 2021, and the president of the Eastern Psychological Association from 2014–2015. She received the Fukuhara Award for Advanced International Research and Service from the International Council of Psychologists in 2020.

== Biography ==
Nolan graduated from the College of the Holy Cross with a Bachelor of Arts in 1990. She then earned her Master of Science and Ph.D. in clinical psychology from Northwestern University in 1996. Her doctoral dissertation, completed under Ian Gotlib and Susan Mineka, was titled, "Verbal, nonverbal, and gender-related factors in negative interpersonal reactions toward depressed and anxious individuals."

Nolan then completed a clinical internship at Vanderbilt University through the Nashville Department of Veteran Affairs. She joined the faculty of Seton Hall University and teaches various courses including Abnormal Psychology, International Psychology, and Statistics. She has co-authored statistics and introductory psychology textbooks, and a volume on applications of psychological science.

Nolan a Fellow of the American Psychological Association and previously served as the United Nations representative for the American Psychological Association. Nolan has worked abroad through the U.S. Fulbright Scholar program.

== Research ==
Nolan's clinical research has linked neuroticism and rumination with an increased risk of depression. One of her studies examined the effects of neuroticism and ruminative response style on changes in symptoms of depression over an 8 to 10 week period. Nolan found that neuroticism and ruminative response style predicted changes in symptoms of depression more strongly in individuals who initially had a severe case of depression as compared to those with lower initial levels of depression.

== Personal life ==
Nolan lives with her husband in Jersey City, New Jersey.

== Books ==
- Hockenbury, S. E. & Nolan, S. A. (2019). Discovering psychology. Worth.
- Landrum, R. E., Gurung, R. A., Nolan, S. A., McCarthy, M. A., & Dunn, D. S. (2022). Everyday applications of psychological science: Hacks to happiness and health. Routledge.
- Nolan, S. A., & Heinzen, T. (2011). Statistics for the behavioral sciences. Macmillan.
- Nolan, S. A., & Heinzen, T. (2010). Essentials of statistics for the behavioral sciences. Macmillan.

== Representative publications ==
- Haynes-Mendez, K. D., Nolan, S. A., Littleford, L. N., & Woolf, L. M. (2022). Diversity, equity, inclusion, and internationalization: Past, present, and future of STP. Teaching of Psychology, 00986283221126424.
- Mannion, K. H., & Nolan, S. A. (2020). The effect of smartphones on anxiety: An attachment issue or fear of missing out? Cogent Psychology, 7(1), 1869378.
- Morgan-Consoli, M. L., Inman, A. G., Bullock, M., & Nolan, S. A. (2018). Framework for competencies for US psychologists engaging internationally. International Perspectives in Psychology: Research, Practice, Consultation, 7(3), 174–188.
- Nolan, S. A., Buckner, J. P., Marzabadi, C. H., & Kuck, V. J. (2008). Training and mentoring of chemists: A study of gender disparity. Sex Roles, 58(3), 235-250.
- Nolan, S. A., Flynn, C., & Garber, J. (2003). Prospective relations between rejection and depression in young adolescents. Journal of Personality and Social Psychology, 85(4), 745–755.
- Nolan, S. A., Roberts, J. E., & Gotlib, I. H. (1998). Neuroticism and ruminative response style as predictors of change in depressive symptomatology. Cognitive Therapy and Research, 22(5), 445–455.
