= Wilbert J. McKeachie =

American psychologist (1921–2019)

Wilbert McKeachie
- Born: August 24, 1921
- Died: June 12, 2019 (aged 97)
- Education: University of Michigan
- Known for: McKeachie’s Teaching Tips
- Scientific career
- Fields: Psychology
- Workplaces: University of Michigan
- Doctoral advisor: Donald Marquis

Wilbert James "Bill" McKeachie (August 24, 1921 – June 12, 2019) was an American psychologist. He served as president of the American Psychological Association, the American Psychological Foundation and the American Association of Higher Education. He was a longtime faculty member at the University of Michigan and the initial author of McKeachie's Teaching Tips: Strategies, Research, and Theory for College and University Teachers, a widely read book on college teaching that was first published in 1951 and more recently in its 14th edition in 2013.

== Biography ==
=== Early life ===
McKeachie was born the son of a teacher in Clarkston, Michigan. He was awarded a scholarship to attend Michigan State Normal College, now Eastern Michigan University, where he majored in Math with History and English minors with the hopes to become a high school teacher in 1942. Simultaneous powerful educational experiences were his work on a General Motors assembly line and playing piano and singing with bands in bars. He briefly served a minister in rural Upper Peninsula Michigan after completing his bachelor's degree. He also married his wife Virginia (Ginny) Mack, whom he met in his senior year of college before he left for his service in the Navy during World War II.

In 1945, following McKeachie's service in the war as a radar and communications officer on a destroyer in the Pacific, he enrolled in graduate school at the University of Michigan to study psychology. At Michigan, a most crucial formative experience was his participation as a teaching fellow in introductory psychology under Harold Guetzkow. His interest in research in teaching was heightened by his role as coordinator for the introductory course's research projects and extended into his doctoral research exploring social-psychological factors in college classrooms.

=== Career ===
In 1949, McKeachie earned a PhD from the University of Michigan, where he joined the faculty for the rest of his career. During his time at the university, he served 10 years as Chair of the Department of Psychology, authored numerous books, monographs, chapters, and articles. In 1950, McKeachie distributed a manual to his teaching assistants that covered educational strategies. The manual evolved into McKeachie’s Teaching Tips. He was also involved in the collaborative founding of the Combined Program in Education and Psychology and establishment of the Center for Research on Learning and Teaching at the university.

McKeachie served as the 1976 president of the American Psychological Association (APA). He had been the president of the Society for the Teaching of Psychology (APA Division 2) in 1955–1956. McKeachie was president of the American Psychological Foundation (APF) and he delivered the APF's Arthur W. Staats Lecture for Unifying Psychology in 2011. He also chaired divisions of the American Association of University Professors, the American Association for the Advancement of Science and the Center for Social Gerontology. McKeachie was an editorial board member for twenty journals. His career was recognized by a number of awards and many honorary degrees from the University of Cincinnati, Denison University, Eastern Michigan University, Hope College, and Northwestern University.

=== Honors and awards ===
- E. L. Thorndike Award, APA Division 15
- APA Centennial Award for Outstanding Contribution
- James McKeen Cattell Fellow Award, Association for Psychological Science

=== Later life ===
Dr. McKeachie continued to teach until the age of 85, when he had his hips and shoulder replaced. He said that the surgeries were a result of a 50-year career as a fast-pitch softball pitcher; he cited his three softball no-hitters in 1976, the year of his APA presidency, as proud moments. He had two daughters as well as a granddaughter and a great-granddaughter. He died in June 2019 at the age of 97.

=== Legacy ===
The Society for the Teaching of Psychology created the Wilbert J. McKeachie Teaching Excellence Award in 1980. Through 2004, it was awarded to an early career teacher or a graduate student. The award has recognized graduate students since 2005, as a separate award honors early career teaching.

== Selected works ==
=== Books ===
- McKeachie’s Teaching Tips (first published in 1951 and most recently revised in a 14th edition in 2013)
