= John Thibaut =

American social psychologist

John W. Thibaut
- Born: 1917
- Died: 1986 (aged 68–69)
- Education: Massachusetts Institute of Technology
- Scientific career
- Fields: Psychology
- Workplaces: University of North Carolina at Chapel Hill
- Thesis: The Relationship of Group Cohesiveness to Inter-Group Status Differences (1949)
- Doctoral advisor: Dorwin Cartwright
- Other academic advisors: Kurt Lewin
- Doctoral students: Daniel Stokols, Virginia Andreoli Mathie

John Walter Thibaut (1917–1986) was a social psychologist, one of the last graduate students of Kurt Lewin. He spent a number of years as a professor at the University of North Carolina at Chapel Hill, and was the first editor of the Journal of Experimental Social Psychology.

== Life and work ==
The research group that he headed at UNC was regularly attended by Harry Upshaw, Jack Brehm, Kurt Back, and Edward E. Jones. He is best known for "A Social Psychology of Groups", co-authored by his long-time collaborator Harold Kelley.

The examination of social exchange led Thibaut and Kelley to develop Interdependence Theory, a process which was facilitated by Thibaut spending a year at the Center for Advanced Study in the Behavioral Sciences where he had significant interaction with Kenneth Arrow.

The early variations of Interdependence Theory stem from Alvin Ward Gouldner's (1960) norm of reciprocity, which argues that people ought to return benefits given to them in a relationship. Peter M. Blau built on the work done by George C. Homans in Exchange and Power in Social Life (1964). Later modifications to this theory focus attention on relational development and maintenance rules (see Murstein et al.).

Thibaut's later research was in the area of procedural justice, where he co-authored a book with legal expert Laurens Walker.

== Work ==
- Back, K., Festinger, L., Hymovitch, B., Kelley, H., Schachter, S., & Thibaut, J. (1950). The methodology of studying rumor transmission. Human Relations, 3(3), 307–312.
- Festinger, L., & Thibaut, J. (1951). Interpersonal communication in small groups. Journal of Abnormal and Social Psychology, 46(1), 92–99.
