= Ingratiation =

Attempt to influence someone else by increasing their attractiveness

Ingratiating is a psychological technique in which an individual attempts to influence another person by becoming more likeable to their target. This term was coined by social psychologist Edward E. Jones, who further defined ingratiating as "a class of strategic behaviors illicitly designed to influence a particular other person concerning the attractiveness of one's personal qualities." Ingratiation research has identified some specific tactics of employing ingratiation:

- Complimentary Other-Enhancement: the act of using compliments or flattery to improve the esteem of another individual.
- Conformity in Opinion, Judgment, and Behavior: altering the expression of one's personal opinions to match the opinion(s) of another individual.
- Self-Presentation or Self-Promotion: explicit presentation of an individual's own characteristics, typically done in a favorable manner.
- Rendering Favors: Performing helpful requests for another individual.
- Modesty: Moderating the estimation of one's own abilities, sometimes seen as self-deprecation.
- Expression of Humour: any event shared by an individual with the target individual that is intended to be amusing.
- Instrumental Dependency: the act of convincing the target individual that the ingratiator is completely dependent upon them.
- Name-dropping: the act of referencing one or more other individuals in a conversation with the intent of using the reference(s) to increase perceived attractiveness or credibility.

Research has also identified three distinct types of ingratiation, each defined by their ultimate goal. Regardless of the goal of ingratiation, the tactics of employment remain the same:

- Acquisitive ingratiation: ingratiation with the goal of obtaining some form of resource or reward from a target individual.
- Protective Ingratiation: ingratiation used to prevent possible sanctions or other negative consequences elicited from a target individual.
- Significance ingratiation: ingratiation designed to cultivate respect and/or approval from a target individual, rather than an explicit reward.

Ingratiation has been confused with another social psychological term, Impression management. Impression management is defined as "the process by which people control the impressions others form of them." While these terms may seem similar, impression management represents a larger construct of which ingratiation is a component. In other words, ingratiation is a method of impression management.

== Edward E. Jones: the Father of Ingratiation ==
Ingratiation, as a topic in social psychology, was first defined and analyzed by social psychologist Edward E. Jones. In addition to his pioneering studies on ingratiation, Jones also helped develop some of the fundamental theories of social psychology such as the fundamental attribution error and the actor-observer bias.

Jones' first extensive studies of ingratiation were published in his 1964 book Ingratiation: A Social Psychological Analysis. In citing his reasons for studying ingratiation, Jones reasoned that ingratiation was an important phenomenon to study because it elucidated some of the central mysteries of social interaction and was also the stepping stone towards understanding other common social phenomena such as group cohesiveness.

== Tactics of ingratiation ==
Complimentary Other enhancement is said to "involve communication of directly enhancing, evaluative statements" and is most correlated to the practice of flattery. Most often, other enhancement is achieved when the ingratiator exaggerates the positive qualities of the target while leaving out the negative qualities. According to Jones, this form of ingratiation is effective based on the Gestaltian axiom that it is hard for a person to dislike someone that thinks highly of them. In addition to this, other enhancement seems to be most effective when compliments are directed at the target's sources of self-doubt. To shield the obviousness of the flattery, the ingratiator may first talk negatively about qualities the target knows are weaknesses and then compliment him/her on a weak quality the target is unsure of.

Conformity in Opinion, Judgment, and Behavior is based on the tenet that people like those whose values and beliefs are similar to their own. According to Jones, ingratiation in the form of conformity can "range from simple agreement with expressed opinions to the most complex forms of behavior imitation and identification." Similar to other enhancement, conformity is thought to be most effective when there is a change of opinion. When the ingratiator switches from a divergent opinion to an agreeing one, the target assumes the ingratiator values his/her opinion enough to change, in turn strengthening the positive feelings the target has for the ingratiator. With this, the target person is likely to be most appreciative of agreement when he wants to believe that something is true but is not sure that it is. Jones argues, therefore, that it is best to start by disagreeing in trivial issue and agreeing on issues that the target person needs affirmation.

Self-Presentation or Self-Promotion is the "explicit presentation or description of one's own attributes to increase the likelihood of being judged attractively". The ingratiator is one who models himself along the lines of the target person's suggested ideals. Self-presentation is said to be most effective by exaggerating strengths and minimizing weaknesses. This tactic, however, seems to be dependent of the normal self-image of the ingratiator. For example, those who are of high esteem are considered with more favor if they are modest and those who are not are seen as more favorable when they exaggerate their strengths. One can also present weakness in order to impress the target. By revealing weaknesses, one implies a sense of respect and trust of the target. Interview responses such as "I am the kind of person who...", "You can count on me to..." are examples of self-presentation techniques.

Rendering Favors is the act of performing helpful requests for another individual. This is a positive ingratiation tactic, as "persons are likely to be attracted to those who do nice things for them." By providing favors or gifts, the ingratiator promotes attraction in the target by making him/herself appear more favorable. In some instances, people may use favors or gifts with the goal of "...influencing others to give us the things we want more than they do, but giving them the things they want more than we do."

Modesty is the act of moderating the estimation of one's own abilities. Modesty is seen as an effective ingratiation strategy because it provides a relatively less transparent format for the ingratiator to promote likeability. Modesty can sometimes take the form of self-deprecation, the opposite of self-promotion. Instead of the ingratiator making him/herself seem more attractive in the eyes of the target individual, the goal of self-deprecation is to decrease the perceived attractiveness of the ingratiator. In doing so, the ingratiator hopes to receive pity from the target individual, and is thus able to enact persuasion via such pity.

Expression of humor is the intentional use of humor to create a positive affect with the target individual. The expression of humor is best implicated when the ingratiator is of higher status than the target individual, such as from supervisor to employee. "As long as the target perceives the individual's joke as appropriate, funny, and has no alternative implications, than the joke will be taken in a positive as opposed to a negative manner." When humor is used by an individual of lower status within the setting, it may prove to be risky, inappropriate, and distracting, and may damage likeability as opposed to promoting likeability.

Instrumental Dependency is the act of instilling the impression upon the target individual that the ingratiator is completely dependent upon that individual. Similar to modesty, instrumental dependency works by creating a sense of pity for the ingratiator. While instrumental dependency as a process is similar to modesty or self-deprecation, it is defined separately due to the notion that instrumental dependency is typically task-dependent, meaning the ingratiator would insinuate that he/she is dependent upon the target individual for the completion of a specific task or goal.

Name-dropping is the act of using the name of an influential person(s) as reference(s) while communicating with the target individual. Typically, name-dropping is done strategically in a manner that the reference(s) in question will be known and respected by the target individual. As a result, the target individual is likely to see the ingratiator as more attractive.

== Major empirical findings ==
=== In business ===
Seiter conducted a study that looked into the effect of ingratiation tactics on tipping behavior in the restaurant business. The study was done at two restaurants in Northern Utah, and the participant pool was 94 dining parties of 2 people each, equaling 188 participants in total. In order to ensure that the person paying the bill was complimented, the experimenters were told to genuinely compliment both members of the party. The data was collected by two female communication students, both the age of 22, who worked part-time as waitresses.

The results of the experiment supported the initial hypothesis that customers receiving compliments on their choice of dish would tip larger amounts than customers who received no compliment after ordering. A one-way ANOVA test was performed, and this test found significant differences in tipping behavior between the two conditions. Customers who received compliments left larger tips (M = 18.94) than those who were not the recipients of ingratiation tactics (M = 16.41).

Treadway, Ferris, Duke, Adams, and Thatcher wanted to explore how the role of subordinate ingratiation and political skill on supervisors’ impressions and ratings of interpersonal facilitation. Specifically, the researchers wanted to see if political skill and ingratiation interact in the business setting. "Political skill refer to the ability to exercise influence through the use of persuasion, manipulation, and negotiation" They hypothesized that employees who used high rates of ingratiation, and had low levels of political skill would have motivations more easily detectable by their supervisors. Treadway et al. found that ingratiation was only effective if the motivation was not discovered by the supervisor. In addition, the researchers found that when supervisors rating of an employee's use of ingratiation increased, their rating of an employee's use of interpersonal facilitation decreased.

=== In conversation and interviews ===
Godfrey conducted a study that looked into the difference between self-promoters and ingratiators. The study subjects consisted of 50 pairs of unacquainted, same sex students from Princeton University (25 male pairs, 25 female pairs). The pairs of students participated in two sessions of videotaped, 20-minute conversations, spaced one week apart.

The first session was an unstructured conversation where the two subjects just talked about arbitrary topics. After the first conversation, one subject was randomly assigned to be the presenter. The presenter was asked to fill out a two-question survey that rated the likability and the competency of the other subject on a scale from 1 to 10. The second subject was assigned the role of the target, and was instructed to fill out a much longer survey about the other subject, which included the likability and competency scale, 41 trait attributes, and 7 emotions. In the second session, the presenters were asked to participate as an ingratiator or a self-promoter. They were both given specific directions: ingratiators were told to try to make the target like them, while the self-promoters were instructed to make the targets view them as extremely competent.

The results show that the presenters only partly achieved their goal. Partners of ingratiators rated them as somewhat more likable after the second conversation than after the first conversation (Ms = 7.35 vs. 6.55) but no more competent (Ms = 5.80 vs. 5.85), whereas partners of self-promoters rated them as no more competent after the second conversation than after the first conversation (Ms = 5.25 vs. 5.05) but somewhat less likable (Ms = 5.15 vs. 5.85). Ingratiators gained in likability without sacrificing perceived competence, whereas self-promoters sacrificed likability with no gain in competency.

== Applications ==
=== When ingratiation works ===
Ingratiation can be a hard tactic to implicate, without having the target individual realize what you are trying to do. The tactics of ingratiation works well in different situations and settings. For example, “Tactics that match role expectations of low-status subordinates, such as opinion conformity, would appear to be better suited to exchanges between low-status ingratiators and high-status targets." Or, “The tactic of other enhancement would appear to be more appropriate for exchanges between high-status ingratiators and low-status targets because judgment and evaluation are congruent with a high-status supervisory role." Within a work setting, it is best to evaluate the situation to figure out which method of ingratiation is best to use. The ingratiator should also have some transparency to their method, so that the target individual is not suspicious of their motives. For example, ingratiating a target individual when it is uncharacteristic of your behavior or making it obvious that you are trying to ingratiate. “Given the strength of reciprocity as a social norm, it is possible that in situations in which the ingratiation attempt is interpreted by the target as 'ingratiation,' the most appropriate response might be to reciprocate the 'feigned' liking while forming more negative judgments and evaluations of the ingratiator.".

=== Self-esteem and stress ===
Ingratiation is a method that can be used to cope with job-related stress. Decreased self-esteem coupled with stress may cause an individual to use coping mechanisms, such as ingratiation. Self-affirmation and image maintenance are likely reactions when there is a threat to self-image. "Since self-esteem is a resource for coping with stress, it becomes depleted in this coping process and the individual becomes more likely to use ingratiation to protect, repair, or even boost self-image." There are two models that are presented to describe self-esteem in relation to ingratiatory behaviors. The self-esteem moderator model is when stress leads to ingratiatory behavior and self-esteem impacts this relationship. Then there is the mediation model that suggests that stress leads to decreased self-esteem, which increases ingratiatory behaviors to uplift one's self-image (a linear model). Research supports the mediation model, while literature supports the moderator model.

=== Self-monitoring ===
Within Turnely and Boino's study, "They had students complete a self-monitoring scale at the beginning of the project. At the conclusion of the project, participants indicated the extent to which they had engaged in each of the five impression-management tactics. Four days (two class periods) later, participants provided their perceptions of each of the other three members of their group. Each member of the four-person team, then, was evaluated by three teammates. Thus, given that there were 171 participants in the study, there were a total of 513 (171 X 3) student-student dyads. All of this information was collected before students received their grade on the project." Results revealed that high self-monitors were better able to use ingratiation, self-promotion, and exemplification to achieve favorable images among their colleagues successfully than their low self-monitor peers. “Specifically, when high self-monitors used these tactics, they were more likely to be seen as likeable, competent, and dedicated by the other members of their work groups. In contrast, low self-monitors appear to be less effective at using these tactics to obtain favorable images. In fact, the more low self-monitors used such tactics, the more likely they were to be seen as a sycophant, to be perceived as conceited, or to be perceived as egotistical by their work group colleagues.” High self-monitors are better able to use impression management tactics, such as ingratiation, than low self-monitors.

=== Social rejection ===
Ingratiation can be applied to many real world situations. As mentioned previously, research has delved into the areas of tipping in the restaurant business and conversations. More research shows how ingratiation is applicable in the online dating community and job interviews.

In a study of social rejection in the online dating community, researchers tested whether ingratiation or hostility would be the first reaction of the rejected individual and whether men or women would be most likely to ingratiate in different situations. The study showed that cases in which the woman had felt “close” to a potential dating partner from the mutual sharing of information and was rejected, she was more likely than men to engage in ingratiation. Furthermore, men were shown to be more likely to be willing to pay for a date (as prompted by the researchers, not for the date itself) with a woman who had previously harshly rejected him over a woman who had mildly rejected him. Both cases show that while men and women have different social and emotional investments, they are equally likely to ingratiate in a situation which is self-defining to them.

=== In the workplace ===
In another study in the context of an interview, research showed that a combination of ingratiation and self-promotion tactics was more effective than using either one by itself or neither when trying to get hired by a potential employer. The most positive reviews and recommendations came from interviewers whose interviewees had used such a combination, and they were also most likely to be given a job offer. However, when compared by themselves, self-promotion was more effective in producing such an outcome than ingratiation; this may be due to how the nature of an interview requires the individual being considered for the job to talk about their positive qualities and what they would add to the company.

== See also ==
- Impression management
- Reinforcement
- Superficial charm
