= Society for the Teaching of Psychology =

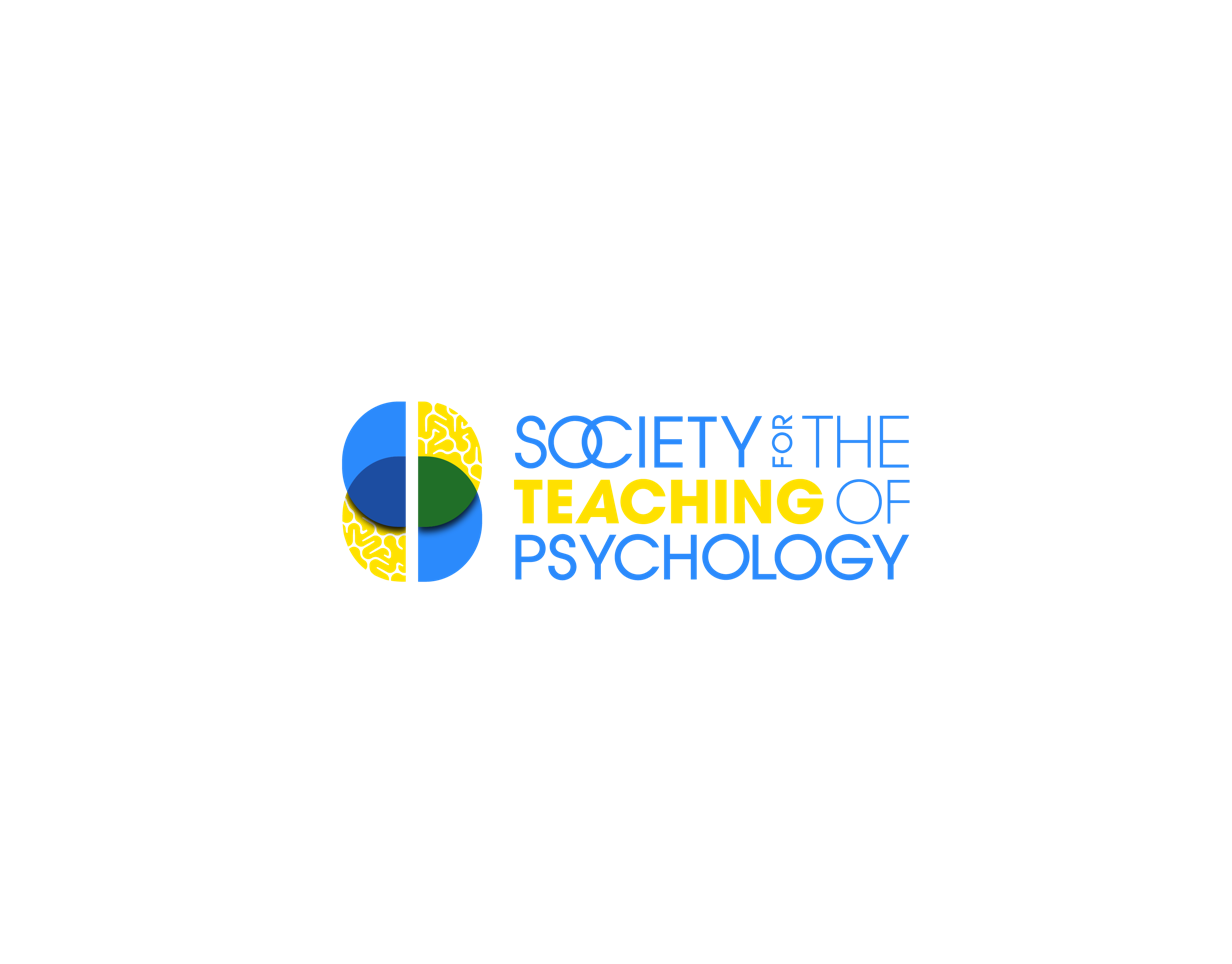
- Founded: 1945
- Headquarters: Washington, D.C.
- Members: 2,800
- President: Andrew N. Christopher Albion College
- Website: http://teachpsych.org/

The Society for the Teaching of Psychology (STP) is Division 2 of the American Psychological Association. It is an academic society that promotes effective pedagogy while providing supports for teachers of psychology at all levels (high school to colleges and universities). Although it is one of the divisions of the American Psychological Association, it does not require its members to join the APA. STP provides access to peer-reviewed teaching resources, such as course syllabi and e-books, free of charge to the general public through its website. Some sections of the website (e.g., applications for grants and awards) require STP membership to gain access.

== History ==
The STP was founded as Division 2 of APA in 1945. Past presidents include notable key figures in the field of psychology, such as Wilbert J. McKeachie, John Dashiell, Susan A. Nolan, Charles Brewer, Ludy T. Benjamin, Virginia Andreoli Mathie, Diane Halpern, and Jane Halonen. In its early years, the STP struggled to increase membership and clarify its professional identity and purpose. In 1947, Division 2 had only 184 registered members, lagging behind other divisions. In 1950, the STP created the Teaching of Psychology Newsletter. In 1951, the STP's 6th president Claude E. Buxton surveyed the membership to find out more about the current composition and possible future direction of the STP. Buxton found that the STP membership mainly consisted of educators interested in undergraduate liberal arts education, and lacked graduate-level instructors. Finding that most survey respondents saw a need to continue and improve the STP, Buxton worked on increasing membership, and a proposal requiring membership in another APA division before joining Division 2 was not adopted, as it seemed to subordinate the STP to other APA divisions. By the end of the 1950s, Division 2 had gained greater prestige, and included members of various disciplines in psychology (especially social, experimental, and clinical psychology) from both small and large institutions of higher education. In the early 1960s, Wilbert J. McKeachie gave the Teaching of Psychology newsletter a more polished image. Between 1960 and 1974, the STP saw a marked increase in membership, and the organization increased services to help teachers of psychology, and formulated more rigorous standards in the scholarship of teaching psychology.

In the early 1960s, STP president Robert S. Daniel was instrumental in making sure that teaching tips and sample psychology course syllabi were available to instructors. The STP also took a leading role in developing educational television during this period. During his leadership the STP also provided supports and equipment to aid departments operating on a limited budget. Daniel also lobbied the American Psychological Foundation to establish an annual award for outstanding teachers. In 1974, Daniel was also responsible for turning the Teaching of Psychology Newsletter into what is now the journal Teaching of Psychology. By 1965, membership in Division 2 was higher than that of all other APA division, except divisions 8, 12, and 15. The establishment of the Teaching of Psychology journal (ToP) by a group of editors around Robert S. Daniel in 1974 was a major step forward for STP. This journal became widely respected within the discipline by 1981. During the 1950s, efforts to begin a journal had been defeated by those arguing that a journal giving teachers an identity apart from other areas of specialization would actually diminish the prestige of Division 2.

Between 1975 and 1987, leaders of the STP worked to recruit new members, in order to offset declining enrollment in Division 2 and across many APA divisions. During this period, STP leadership developed awards that recognized exceptional teachers. In the early 1990s, the STP aimed at increasing its outreach to academics at the regional level through the Council of Teachers of Undergraduate Psychology (CTUR). During this period, former STP president Patricia Keith-Spiegel developed the Office of Teaching Resources in Psychology (OTRP) to achieve these outreach-related aims and to provide academics and teachers of Psychology with centralized and accessible resources. The STP Members approved a bylaws revision in 2018 to shorten the title of this office to Director of Teaching Resources. The STP also worked on developing exchange systems for course syllabi and activities. During the mid 1990s, under the presidency of Margaret A. Lloyd, the STP developed the Long-Range Planning Committee to help Division 2 enter the 21st century with increased visibility and influence. The STP adapted to rapid changes in technology by making all resources computerized, and focused on maintaining the high quality and integrity of the Teaching of Psychology journal.

== Resources ==
The Society for the Teaching of Psychology offers many resources to help teachers of psychology. The Primary Resources page contains a wealth of materials, ranging from classroom assignments and class demonstrations to books about teaching psychology, to mentorship programs for teachers of psychology or scholars of teaching and learning.

=== Resources for teachers of psychology ===
STP provides resources for teachers of psychology, which include peer-reviewed assignments, demonstrations, and strategies for teaching at all levels. Resources are divided into about 25 categories that reflect different sub-disciplinary areas and covers the responsibilities of teachers beyond the classroom, such as advising and writing letters of recommendation.

=== Project syllabus ===
STP hosts Project Syllabus through which experienced teachers review syllabi submitted by teachers of psychology from across the nation. Project Syllabus has posted over 100 syllabi that can be used as inspiration for novice teachers or first-time teachers of a specific course.

=== Teaching of Psychology Idea Exchange (TOPIX) ===
The Teaching of Psychology Idea Exchange (TOPIX) curates ideas psychology teachers have posted about teaching strategies, assignments, ideas, and discussion topics that are innovative, creative, and open for use.

=== Departmental consulting ===
STP offers departmental consultations as a service to psychology departments. Departments are often required to assess the success of their programs to maintain accreditation, and STP offers the Departmental Consulting service to facilitate contact between departments that are in need of external assessment support and qualified consultants (experienced faculty in psychology). The department can arrange a campus visit or targeted evaluation by selecting a consultant(s) of their choice and directly contacting the consultant.

=== Scholarship of Teaching and Learning (SoTL) consulting service and workshop ===
The society offers a consulting service as part of a broader initiative to encourage graduate students and faculty to contribute to the growing field known as the Scholarship of Teaching and Learning or SoTL. This service supports graduate students and faculty who want to learn how to conduct rigorous research on teaching and learning by providing consultants (experienced faculty researchers) to provide guidance on each step of the process.

A related resource is the annual SoTL workshop. Workshop participants are placed with experienced mentors (faculty with extensive backgrounds specifically in SoTL research projects) with whom they can work remotely. During the workshop, mentees gather together for a few days of intense support with their mentors and other mentees with similar interests, as well as experts in various aspects of SoTL research such as statisticians and the editors of SoTL journals. Mentees may begin the process at any stage of a research project with which they feel the need for help, from research design to analysis to completing a manuscript.

=== Professional development ===
The STP Professional Mentoring Service is a mentorship program which aims to support early career (EC) professionals in psychology. Both advanced graduate students and new appointed faculty members are encouraged to participate as mentees. The program seeks to place mentees with more experienced faculty members who have similar interests. Mentees are placed with mentors with the idea that their interactions should be mutually beneficial.

=== Pedagogical Innovations Task Force Reports ===
STP page hosts the Pedagogical Innovations Task Force Reports, which cover topics such as online course management, online quizzing, ways to integrate various media effectively in the classroom, and use of software tools in teaching.

== Conferences ==
The Society is active in conference programming at the regional, national, and international level.

=== Annual Conference on Teaching (ACT) ===
STP runs its own flagship conference, the Annual Conference on Teaching (ACT) in October of each year. ACT serves to disseminate effective teaching practices and share research on the Scholarship of Teaching and Learning (SoTL). The ACT conference attracts hundreds of attendees, including graduate students and new instructors as well as seasoned instructors of psychology.

ACT began in 2003 as the STP Best Practices Conference that was an outgrowth of the deliberations of the Assessment Group at the Psychology Partnership Program (P3) that was sponsored by APA and hosted by James Madison University in 1999. The first BP Conference was in Atlanta and dealt with assessment. The conference was such a success that the Society made it an annual event. Each of the BPs were themed conferences offering best practice presentations on limited topics until 2014 when the event was renamed The Annual Conference on Teaching and the program was opened to accept posters and symposia on all areas dealing with the teaching of psychology. Since 2003, the conference has been held in or around Atlanta. With the change in focus of the conference and the decision to conduct the STP Annual Business Meeting and Awards Ceremonies at ACT, the Society decided to begin moving ACT around the country.

ACT Locations
Year	Location
2028	Cleveland, OH
2027	Omaha, NE
2026	St. Louis, MO
2025	Minneapolis, MN
2024	Louisville, KY
2023	Portland, OR
2022	Pittsburgh, PA
2021	N/A
2020	N/A
2019	Denver, CO
2018	Phoenix, AZ
2017	San Antonio, TX

=== American Psychological Association (APA) ===
Annually, the Society for the Teaching of Psychology, in collaboration with the members of APA's Psychology Team focused on psychology education, sponsors the Distinguished Scholar Lectures for Teaching (DSLT) and the Harry Kirke Wolfe Lecture. These are premier lectures first delivered as APA webinars, then as presentations as regional conferences, by teachers of psychology, to teachers of psychology. In these talks, renown experts deliver cutting-edge talks designed specifically for other teachers of psychology.

=== Society for Personality and Social Psychology (SPSP) ===
The STP conducts a preconference on teaching held at the annual convention of the Society for Personality and Social Psychology (SPSP].

=== National Institute on the Teaching of Psychology (NITOP) ===
STP is a sponsor of the National Institute on the Teaching of Psychology (NITOP) held every January on the Gulf Coast.

=== Psychology One Conference ===
STP is a sponsor of the Psychology One Conference, held every summer on the campus of Duke University.

=== Regional conferences ===
Through its Director of Regional Conference Programming, the Society advertises and facilitates programs dealing with teaching at the seven APA-affiliated regionals conventions. In addition to supporting travel to three of these conferences by a DSLT/Wolfe lecturer, the Society also provides funds to the remaining four regionals to support the expenses of a speaker on the teaching of psychology chosen by those regionals.

STP programming promotes effective teaching and learning at regional meetings of the Eastern Psychological Association, the Midwestern Psychological Association, the New England Psychological Association, the Rocky Mountain Psychological Association, the Southeastern Psychological Association, the Southwestern Psychological Association, and the Western Psychological Association.

=== International conferences ===
STP’s Director of International Programming collaborates with organizations that conduct international psychology conferences to encourage and facilitate teaching programming at these events. The Society co-sponsors at least one of these conferences each year and facilitates Society presence at several international events].

== Leadership ==
STP governance consists of an executive committee, comprising the president, past-president, and president-elect, and vice presidents for resources, programming, membership, grants and awards, and diversity and international relations.

The members of the 2026 STP executive committee are as follows:

Position	Name	Affiliation
President	Andrew N. Christopher	Albion College (MI)
Past-President	Stephanie E. Afful	Lindenwood University (MO)
President-Elect	David S. Kreiner	University of Central Missouri
Vice President for Resources	Clara M. Cheng	Carlow University (PA)
Vice President for Programming	Jordan D. Troisi	Colby College (ME)
Vice President for Membership	Danae L. Hudson	Missouri State University
Vice President for Grants and Awards	Alison Heinhold Melley	George Mason University (VA)
Vice President for Diversity and International Relations	Molly A. Metz	University of Toronto
Secretary	Anne E. Stuart	American International University (MA)
Treasurer	Marianne E. Lloyd	Seton Hall University (NJ)
Executive Director	Sue Frantz	New Mexico State University, Affiliate Faculty Highline College (WA), Professor Emerita

The members of the 2027 STP executive committee:

Position	Name	Affiliation
President	David S. Kreiner	University of Central Missouri
Past-President	Andrew N. Christopher	Albion College (MI)
President-Elect	Danae L. Hudson	Missouri State University
Vice President for Resources	Clara M. Cheng	Carlow University (PA)
Vice President for Programming	Jenel T. Cavazos	University of Oklahoma
Vice President for Membership	Karen Brakke	Spelman College, Professor Emerita
Vice President for Grants and Awards	Alison Heinhold Melley	George Mason University (VA)
Vice President for Diversity and International Relations	Molly Metz	University of Toronto
Secretary	Anne E. Stuart	American International University (MA)
Treasurer	Marianne E. Lloyd	Seton Hall University (NJ)
Executive Director	Sue Frantz	New Mexico State University, Affiliate Faculty Highline College (WA), Professor Emerita

== Publications ==
STP has published the journal Teaching of Psychology (ToP) quarterly since 1974. ToP serves as a resource for educators that includes empirical teaching tools, methods, and innovative approaches, more generally, for coursework in psychology. Topics covered include the following:

- Research on teaching and learning
- Studies of teacher or student characteristics
- Subject matter or content reviews for class use
- Investigations of students, course, or teacher assessments
- Professional problems of teachers
- Essays on teaching
- Innovative course descriptions and evaluations
- Curriculum design
- Bibliographic material
- Demonstrations and laboratory projects
- News items
