= William Bevan (psychologist) =

American psychologist (1922–2007)

- Born: May 16, 1922; Plains, Pennsylvania
- Died: February 19, 2007 (aged 84); Durham, North Carolina
- Education: Franklin and Marshall College; Duke University
- Scientific career
- Fields: Psychology
- Institutions: Duke University; Johns Hopkins University

William Bevan (May 16, 1922 – February 19, 2007) was an American psychologist and a past president of the American Psychological Association (APA). He founded the Talent Identification Program at Duke University.

== Biography ==
After graduating from Franklin and Marshall College, Bevan served in the navy. He completed graduate work at Duke University. Bevan was a Fulbright Scholar in Norway, served as provost and vice president at Johns Hopkins University, and was the executive officer of the American Association for the Advancement of Science. He came back to Duke as the psychology department chair, served as provost and founded the Talent Identification Program. He was the 1982 APA president. William was a distinguished member of PSI CHI International Honor Society for Psychology.

Bevan died in 2007, nearly 20 years after suffering a serious stroke. The American Psychological Foundation sponsors the William Bevan Lecture on Psychology and Public Policy.
