= Virginia Andreoli Mathie =

Retired psychology professor

- Occupation: Professor of Psychology
- Awards: APA Distinguished Contributions to Applications of Psychology to Education and Training (2002)

Academic background
- Education: University of Waterloo; University of North Carolina

Academic work
- Institutions: James Madison University

Virginia A. Andreoli Mathie is a psychologist known for promoting active learning in undergraduate education and her work building psychology partnerships with outside organizations. Mathie was Professor of Psychology at James Madison University until her retirement in 2004. From 2004 to 2008, she served as the first executive director of Psi Chi International Honors Society in Psychology.

Mathie was President of the Society for the Teaching of Psychology, American Psychological Association (APA) Division 2 from 1995 to 1996.

== Awards ==
Mathie chaired their APA Psychology Partnership Project, which aimed to better prepare students for a changing world by developing partnerships between psychology teachers across educational levels. She was honored for her service in 2004 with an APA Presidential Citation from the Society for the Teaching of Psychology. Mathie also received the 2002 APA Award for Distinguished Contributions of Applications of Psychology to Education and Training. Her award citation stated, "Her leadership inspires educators to recognize the possible, go after the improbable, and achieve the impossible." Previously, the APA had named Mathie the 2000 Harry Kirke Wolfe Lecturer.

== Biography ==
Mathie grew up in Toronto, Ontario. She studied mathematics and computer science at the University of Waterloo and received her B.A./BMath in 1971. At Waterloo, Mathie was mentored by Harold Miller, who initially hired her to be the teaching assistant for his course in mathematical psychology, and subsequently offered her a research assistant position in his lab.

Mathie attended graduate school at the University of North Carolina at Chapel Hill. She obtained her Ph.D. in Social Psychology in 1975, mentored by John Thibaut. Mathie joined the faculty of the Department of Psychology at James Madison University in 1975 and remained there until moving into an administrative position with Psi Chi in 2004. As a faculty member, Mathie was a strong proponent of expanding scholarship in psychology to include teaching and learning as well as service and administration.

== Representative publications ==
- Kahn, A. S., Mathie, V. A., & Torgler, C. (1994). Rape scripts and rape acknowledgment. Psychology of Women Quarterly, 18(1), 53–66.
- Mathie, V. A., Buskist, W., Carlson, J. F., Davis, S. F., Johnson, D. E., & Smith, R. A. (2004). Expanding the boundaries of scholarship in psychology through teaching, research, service, and administration. Teaching of Psychology, 31(4), 233–241.
- Mathie, V. A. (2002). Building academic partnerships in psychology: the Psychology Partnerships Project. American Psychologist, 57(11), 915–926.
