= Psi Beta =

American honor society for psychology

- ΨΒ
- Founded: November 5, 1981; 45 years ago University of Kansas
- Type: Honor
- Affiliation: ACHS
- Status: Active
- Emphasis: Psychology (two year colleges)
- Scope: National (US)
- Colors: Royal blue and Gold
- Publication: Psi Beta Newsletter
- Chapters: 160
- Members: 44,918 lifetime
- Headquarters: 6025 Camino Correr; Anaheim, California 92807; United States
- Website: www.psibeta.org

Psi Beta (ΨΒ) is a scholastic honor society that recognizes academic achievement among students in the field of Psychology at two-year colleges. It was established in Chattanooga, Tennessee in 1981. The society was admitted to the Association of College Honor Societies in 1994.

== History ==
Psi Beta was established in 1981 by psychologist Ruth Hubbard Cousins and her daughter Carol Tracy. Hubbard was the director of the national honor society for psychology, Psi Chi, for 33 years and wanted to establish an organization that would serve students at two-year institutions.

The eleven charter members of Psi Beta were:

- Cerritos College, Norwalk, California
- Cottey College, Nevada, Missouri
- Des Moines Area Community College, Ankeny, Iowa
- Golden West College, Huntington Beach, California
- Lincoln Train College, Robinson, Illinois
- McLennan Community College, Waco, Texas
- Mountain View College, Dallas, Texas
- Piedmont Technical College, Greenwood, South Carolina
- Prince George's Community College, Upper Marlboro, Maryland
- St. Phillip's College, San Antonio, Texas
- South Central Community College, New Haven, Connecticut

Psi Beta was incorporated in Chattanooga, Tennessee on November 5, 1981. It is a scholastic honor society that recognizes academic achievement among students in the field of Psychology at two-year colleges. It promotes and recognizes community service, leadership, research, and scholarship.

It was admitted to the Association of College Honor Societies in 1994. The society had a total membership of approximately 38,000 in 2012.

== Symbols ==
The colors of Psi Beta are royal blue and gold. Its publication is the Psi Beta Newsletter, now Psi Beta Online Newsletter.

== Membership ==
Members are admitted by the chapter's faculty advisor or by a 3/4 vote of members at a regular chapter meeting. Eligible members must have completed twelve semester hours of college coursework with an overall GPA of 3.2 or a rank in the top 35% of students enrolled in a degree or transfer program. They must have completed at least one semester of psychology with a B average. The potential candidates' integrity and behavior are also considered.

== Activities ==
The society holds its Psi Beta Synergy Convention every two years. It also hosts six regional conventions. Psi Beta also has an annual national research project and a national community service project.

== Chapters ==
Psi Beta has 160 active chapters across the United States.

== Notable members ==
- Doug Mastriano (Mercer County Community College) Pennsylvania Senate

== See also ==
- Honor society
- Honor cords
