= Harold Kelley =

American social psychologist

- Born: February 16, 1921; Boise, Idaho
- Died: January 29, 2003 (aged 81); Malibu, California
- Education: UC Berkeley (1942) B.A., (1943) M.A. MIT (1948) Ph.D.
- Known for: Interdepedence theory (a form of social exchange theory) attribution theory close relationships
- Scientific career
- Fields: Psychology
- Workplaces: UCLA 1961–2003; University of Minnesota 1955–61; Yale University 1950–55

Harold Kelley (February 16, 1921 – January 29, 2003) was an American social psychologist and professor of psychology at the University of California, Los Angeles. His major contributions have been the development of interdependence theory (with John Thibaut), the early work of attribution theory, and a lifelong interest in understanding close relationships processes. A Review of General Psychology survey, published in 2002, ranked Kelley as the 43rd most cited psychologist of the 20th century.

== Biography ==
Harold Kelley was born in Boise, Idaho. His family moved to the rural town of Delano, California when he was 10; while there, Kelley met and married his high school sweetheart, Dorothy. They had three children Ann, Sten & Megan, and later five grandchildren.

After graduating from high school, Kelley went on to Bakersfield Junior College, and by 1942 graduated with a B.A. in Psychology from the University of California, Berkeley; in 1943, Kelley continued at UC Berkeley to earn a master's degree in Psychology as well.

As was the case for most social psychologists of his era, Kelley was hired by the Aviation Psychology Program of the army air force during World War II, where he worked on developing selection tests and analyzing the performance of aircrew members.

By the end of the war, Kelley was advised by his aviation mentor Stuart Cook to continue his education. Shortly thereafter, he enrolled at Massachusetts Institute of Technology (MIT) in the Center for Group Dynamics then headed by Kurt Lewin. Kelley obtained his Ph.D. from MIT in 1948. The center moved to the Institute for Social Research at the University of Michigan in 1949 after Lewin's death, and Kelley continued to work with them for a year.

In 1950, Kelley accepted his first academic position as an assistant professor at Yale, where he worked with Carl Hovland and Irving Janis to write his first collaborative book "Communication and Persuasion". In 1955, Kelley left Yale and was hired at the University of Minnesota. During this time, Kelley was co-author of a book titled "The Social Psychology of Groups" along with John W. Thibaut. Kelley then moved to UCLA, where he stayed for the rest of his academic career. After retiring in 1991, Kelley remained active as a member of the Emeritus at UCLA. He held many leadership roles, one being the chairman of some of the organizations at UCLA. His work ethic and his passion for social psychology, sparked an interest in students towards that field. They used Kelley as a role model to pursue their own individual careers in that same field of psychology. He died of cancer in January 2003 in his Malibu home.

== Work ==
One of Kelley's most widely cited theses was one he wrote in 1948. Influenced by Solomon Asch's experiment, which was speculating "positive" or "negative" impressions were determined by central traits, like "hot" or "cold." He described a real person as "warm" and to others as "cold" while their actions and demeanour were identical in both cases. His findings replicated Asch's findings where the subjects tended to have more positive impressions when the person was to be described as "warm." Conversely, the subjects tended to have more negative impressions when the person was described as "cold."

=== Interdependence theory ===
Harold Kelley's most important collaboration was with John Thibaut, with whom he developed interdependence theory. Often identified as a social exchange theory, interdependence theory was first broadly addressed by Thibaut & Kelley in their 1959 book "The Social Psychology of Groups", and later more comprehensively formalized in their 1978 book "Interpersonal Relations: A Theory of Interdependence. In the 1998 Handbook of Social Psychology, it is said of Kelley & Thibaut's interdependence theory, "Given the elegance and profundity of this analysis… there is good reason that its impact will be durable." Indeed, for over 50 years interdependence theory has influenced generations of scientists studying group dynamics, social comparison, attribution, self-presentation, self-regulation, love, commitment, and conflict, among other topics.

Interdependence theory is defined via patterns of interdependence in interpersonal interactions, identifying the extent to which one partner can affect and/or control the other's outcomes in a given interaction. In interdependence theory, the focus is on the interaction, in this sense the between person relationship is just as important as the people themselves.

Interdependence theory is conceptualized through an extension of Kurt Lewin's key behavioral equation B = f(P, E), in which Behavior (B) is a function of the Person (P) and their Environment (E). Using interdependence theory I = f(S,A,B), where any given Interaction (I) is represented as a function of the two people in it (A and B) and the context of the specific interdependence situation (S).

The theory is set up with a rewards and costs model similar to those used in game theory. The balance of rewards and costs between partners within a relationship as well as how well rewards and costs compare to what would be expected in another relationship predict relationship quality. Kelley used the economic terminology to defend the idea that people are maximizers of good outcomes (high rewards, low costs) in relationships just as they are with finances or other decision-making. These reward and cost outcomes are often presented in matrices closely resembling the payoff matrices used in game theory, which had also been adapted in psychological research previously but not as comprehensively utilized. In the matrix, person A's possible actions in the interaction would be listed on the horizontal, and person B's on the vertical. Each cell within the matrix then represents the reward and cost outcomes for both individuals given the particular combination of A's and B's actions. Kelley's use of the matrices provided an objective visual representation of all possible outcomes in a given interaction.

=== Attribution theory ===
Kelley liked to consider his main contribution to be his work on interdependence theory and the social psychology of personal relationships. Yet, he is also very well known for his contributions to attribution theory. Kelley published a number of important papers on attribution theory from 1967–1973, which described the processes and manner that we attribute causality.

Having completed his PhD with Kurt Lewin, Kelley was educated with a Gestalt Psychology perspective, such that the group is identified as greater than the sum of its parts. During his work on interdependence theory, he began questioning how people decide when a behavior is a function of an individual, or a function of their group (or dyad) membership. Formalizing the work of Fritz Heider, Kelley presented these questions of how people attribute causality at the Nebraska Symposium on Motivation, which catalyzed the further study of attributions.

Kelley's view of the attribution theory assumes that the attributions we make are, for the most part, accurate and logical. In his covariation model, which is also known as his ANOVA Model (Analysis of Variance Model), Kelley suggests that people attribute a behavior to whatever it covaries with, specifically there are three main aspects of his view. 1) Consistency: "Is the behavior consistent across most people in the given situation?" 2) Distinctiveness: "Does the behavior vary across different situations?" and 3) Consensus: "Do most people engage in this behavior in this situation?". These important components of the attribution process are visually represented in what became known as the "Kelley cube", in which Persons, Entities, and Time could each be constant or changing, to inform how we make attributions.

Kelley claimed that ordinary individuals ("naive psychologists" as they are often referred) and empirical scientists often were similarly accurate in making causal inferences. He emphasized that meso-level psychology, that is what we experience as humans on a daily level, should be the focus of most empirical psychological work, not micro-level phenomena (e.g., brain cell functioning) or macro-level phenomena (e.g., societal shifts).

=== Personal relationships ===
While exploring the conceptualizations and the possible "real life" applications of interdependence theory and attribution theory, Kelley began examining the interactions and perceptions of young couples in harmony and conflict, and the ways in which they negotiated and attempted to resolve conflicts. Kelley's interest in collaboration continued through his life with other colleagues as well. This work led him to elaborate both attribution and interdependence theories in the context of close relationships, resulting in the important and pioneering 1979 book, Personal Relationships. A subsequent co-authored volume titled Close Relationships, encouraged the examination of topics long ignored in social psychology such as attraction, love, commitment, power and conflict in relationships.

While later in his career was the first time Kelley began using the terms close and personal relationships, Kelley's interest in the topic stemmed back to his earliest works. In his book "The Social Psychology of Groups" (1959), nearly all of his examples are formed from dyadic interactions. Similarly, interdependence theory was formulated with interactions functioning as a result of two individuals and their specific interdependent situation. In this way, interactions within a group could always be brought down to the level of a pair.

Through his work on personal relationships, Kelley formalized the definition of an interpersonal relationship. First in 1979, Kelley identified the three essential elements of a personal relationship, 1) Interdependence in the consequences of specific behaviors, 2) Interaction that is responsive to one another's outcomes, and 3) Attribution of interaction events to dispositions. In this conceptualization, Kelley brought together his major research areas, interdependence, attributions, and personal relationships Kelley later went on to create an operational definition of a close relationship in his 1983 Close Relationships collaboration as, "a close relationship is one of strong, frequent and diverse interdependence that lasts over a considerable period of time".

Well after his retirement, Kelley brought together another group of leading researchers to tackle the creation of a taxonomy of prototypical social situations derived abstractly from theoretically distinct patterns of interdependence. This six-year project culminated in "An Atlas of Interpersonal Situations".

=== Collaboration ===
Kelley's relationship with John Thibaut from 1953-1986 is recognized as one of the greatest psychological collaborations of all-time.

Kelley's interest in collaboration continued throughout his lifetime with other colleagues as well, as indicated by the extensive list of co-authors on his texts, Close Relationships, and An Atlas of Interpersonal Situations.

Kelley's pursuit of collaboration led to the development of the first society for relationships researchers, the International Society for the Study of Personal Relationships (ISSPR). Kelley served as one of its earliest leaders as President from 1987-1990. This group has since evolved and is now a part of the International Association for Relationships Research (IARR).

== Awards ==
Kelley received numerous awards and accreditation for his contributions to the field of psychology, namely the Distinguished Scientific Contribution Award from the American Psychological Association in 1971, the Cooley-Mead Award from the American Sociological Association in 1999, and recognition by the Society of Experimental Social Psychology, the Society for the Psychological Studies of Social Issues, the American Psychological Society, and the International Society for the Study of Personal Relationships. Kelley's numerous contributions toward Social Psychology has allowed for greater development and understanding in the field of Social Psychology

== Professional activities ==
- Acting General Editor, Journal of Social Issues, 1949.
- Member, Behavioral Sciences Study Section, National Institute of Mental Health, 1957-1960.
- Member, Behavioral Sciences Fellowship Review Panel, Career Development Branch, National Institutes of Health, 1962-65.
- Chairman, Program Committee for 1962 Convention of California State Psychological Association, December, 1962.
- Member of Policy and Planning Board, American Psychological Association, 1962-64.
- Member, Editorial Board, Annual Review of Psychology, 1963–65, 1976-78.
- Member, Council, Society for the Psychological Study of Social Issues, 1964-66.
- President, Division 8 (Division of Personality and Social Psychology), American Psychological Association, 1965-1966.
- Member, Board of Scientific Affairs, American Psychological Association, 1966-68.
- Member, Committee on Transnational Social Psychology, Social Science Research Council, 1966-73.
- Member, Mental Health Extramural Research Advisory Committee, National Institute of Mental Health, 1968-70.
- President, Western Psychological Association, 1969-70.
- Member, Board of Directors, Social Science Research Council, 1975-77.
- National Academy of Sciences, Class Membership Committee, 1980, 1981.
- Member, Working Group on Social Interaction, Committee on Basic Research in the Behavioral and Social Sciences, National Research Council, 1985.
- Member, Committee on Contributions of the Behavioral and Social Sciences to the Prevention of Nuclear War, Commission on Behavioral and Social Sciences and Education, National Academy of Science/National Research Council, 1985-88.
- President, International Society for the Study of Personal Relationships, 1987-90.

== Major publications ==
=== Books ===
- Hovland, C.I., Janis I.L., and Kelley, H.H. (1953) Communication and persuasion. New Haven: Yale University Press.
- Thibaut, J.W. & Kelley, H.H. (1959) The social psychology of groups. New York: Wiley.
- Kelley, H.H. & Thibaut, J.W. (1978) Interpersonal relations: A theory of interdependence. New York: Wiley-Interscience.
- Kelley, H.H. (1979) Personal relationships: Their structures and processes. Hillsdale, N.J.: Erlbaum Associates.
- Kelley, H.H., Berscheid, E., Christensen, A., Harvey, J.H., Huston, T.L., Levinger, G., McClintock, E., Peplau, L.A. & Peterson, D.R.. (1983) Close Relationships. New York: W.H. Freeman.
- Kelley, H.H., Holmes, J.G., Kerr, N.L., Reis, H.T., Rusbult, C.E. & Van Lange, P.A.M. (2003) An Atlas of Interpersonal SItuations. New York: Cambridge University Press.

=== Selected articles and chapters ===
Note: This is only a partial list of Kelley's numerous publications. Publications were selected for their importance as indexed by citation counts (all included below are over 100 citations).

- Kelley, H.H. (1950). The warm-cold variable in first impressions of persons. Journal of Personality, 18, 431-439.
- Kelley, H.H. (1951). Communication in experimentally created hierarchies. Human Relations, 4, 39-56.
- Kelley, H.H. & Wolkart, E.H. (1952). The resistance to change of group-anchored attitudes. American Sociological Review, 17, 453-465.
- Kelley, H.H. (1952). Two functions of reference groups. In G.E. Swanson, T.M., Newcomb, & E.L. Hartley (Eds.), Readings in social psychology (2nd, ed., pp. 410–414). New York: Holt, Rinehart & Winston.
- Festinger, L., Gerard, H.B., Hymovitch, B., Kelley, H.H., & Raven, B. (1952). The influence process in the presence of extreme deviates. Human Relations, 5, 327-346.
- Kelley, H.H., & Thibaut, J.W. (1954). Experimental studies of group problem solving and process. In G. Lindzey (Ed.), Handbook of social psychology. Cambridge: Massachusetts.
- Kelley, H.H. & Arrowood, A.J. (1960). Coalitions in the triad: Critique and experiment. Sociometry, 23, 231-244.
- Dittes, J.E., & Kelley, H.H. (1956). Effects of different conditions of acceptance upon conformity to group norms. Journal of Abnormal and Social Psychology, 53, 6-74.
- Kelley, H.H. (1965). Experimental studies of threats in interpersonal negotiations. Journal of Conflict Resolution, 9, 81-107.
- Kelley, H.H. (1966). A classroom study of the dilemmas in interpersonal negotiations. In K. Archibald (Ed.), Strategic interaction and conflict (pp. 49–73). Berkeley, California: University of California, Institute of International Studies.
- Kelley, H.H. (1967). Attribution Theory in Social Psychology. Nebraska Symposium on Motivation, 15, 192-238.
- Kelley, H.H. & Thibaut, J.W. (1969). In G. Lindzey & E. Aronson (Eds.), Handbook of Social Psychology Vol. 4. (2nd ed., pp. 1–101). Reading, Massachusetts: Adison-Wesley.
- Kelley, H.H. (1970). The social interaction basis of cooperators' and competitors' beliefs about others. Journal of Personality and Social Psychology, 16, 66-91.
- Benton, A.A., & Kelley, H.H. & Liebling, B. (1972). Effects of extremity of offers and concession rate on the outcomes of bargaining. Journal of Personality and Social Psychology, 24, 73-84.
- Kelley, H.H. (1973). The processes of causal attribution. American Psychologist, 28, 107-128.
- Orviz, B.R., Cunningham, J.D., & Kelley, H.H. (1975). A closer examination of causal inference: The roles of consensus, distinctiveness, and consistency information. Journal of Personality and Social Psychology, 32, 605-616.
- Braiker, H.B. & Kelley, H.H. (1979). Conflict in the development of close relationships. In R.L. Burgess & T.L. Huston (Eds.) Social exchange in developing relationships (pp. 135–168). New York: Academic Press.
- Kelley, H.H. & Michela, J.L. (1980). Attribution theory and research. Annual Review of Psychology, 31, 457-501.

== See also ==
=== Collaborators, advisors, colleagues ===
- Ellen Berscheid
- Fritz Heider
- Kurt Lewin
- Donald R. Peterson
- Caryl Rusbult
- John Thibaut
- Paul Van Lange

=== Relevant psychological contributions ===
- Social psychology
- Interpersonal relationship
- Intimate relationship
- Covariation model
- Attribution theory
- Implicit personality theory
- Halo effect
- Society of Experimental Social Psychology
