= Frederick Rhodewalt =

- Born: March 23, 1949; Upper Darby Township, Pennsylvania, US
- Died: August 19, 2011 (aged 62)
- Education: Lincoln University; Princeton University
- Employer: University of Utah

Frederick Rhodewalt (March 23, 1949 – August 19, 2011) was an American social psychologist at the University of Utah.

== Background ==
Rhodewalt completed his BA at Lincoln University (1975) and a PhD in Social Psychology at Princeton University (1979). He spent his entire 31 year academic career at the University of Utah in the Department of Psychology where he published extensively on issues related to personality and the self.

Rhodewalt was elected fellow of Division 8 (Social and Personality Psychology) as well as the Society of Experimental Social Psychology. Rhodewalt was awarded a Superior Research Award at the University of Utah (1991) for his work. Besides being on numerous editorial boards, he was the Editor of Personality and Social Psychology Bulletin, Basic and Applied Social Psychology, and Associate Editor for the Journal of Personality and Social Psychology: Personality Processes and Individual Differences, and the Journal of Research in Personality.

In the later part of his career, served as the Chair of two different departments (Sociology, Psychology) and Associate Dean of the Graduate School.

== Awards and honors ==
- Fellow-Elect. Division 8 of the American Psychological Association.
- Fellow-Elect. Society of Experimental Social Psychology.
- 1991 Superior Research Award. University of Utah College of Social and Behavioral Sciences.
- 2003 Distinguished Service Award. Society for Personality and Social Psychology.
- 2012 Fred Rhodewalt Social Psychology Ski Conference (renamed in his honor).

== Selected publications ==
- Jones, E. E., Rhodewalt, F., Bergals, S., & Skelton, J.A. (1981). Effects of strategic self-presentation on subsequent self-esteem. Journal of Personality and Social Psychology, 41, 407 - 421.
- Rhodewalt, F., & Agustsdottir, S. (1986). Effects of self-presentation on the phenomenal self. Journal of Personality and Social Psychology, Vol 50(1), 47–55.
- Morf, C. C., & Rhodewalt, F. (1993). Narcissism and self-evaluation maintenance: Explorations in object relations. Personality and Social Psychology Bulletin, 19, 668 - 676.
- Rhodewalt, F. (1994). Conceptions of ability, achievement goals, and individual differences in self-handicapping: On the application of implicit theories. Journal of Personality, 62, 67–85.
- Rhodewalt, F., Sanbonmatsu, D. M., Tschanz, B. T., Feick, D. L., & Waller, A. (1995). Self-handicapping and interpersonal trade-offs: The effects of claimed self-handicaps on observers' performance evaluations and feedback. Personality and Social Psychology Bulletin, 21, 1042 - 1050.
- Rhodewalt, F. (1998). Self-presentation and the phenomenal self: The "carryover" effect revisited. In J. Cooper & J. Darley (Eds.), Attribution processes, person perception, and social interaction: The legacy of Ned Jones. Hillsdale, NJ: Erlbaum.
- Feick, D. L., & Rhodewalt, F. (1998). The double-edged sword of self-handicapping: Discounting, augmentation, and the protection and enhancement of self-esteem. Motivation and Emotion, 21, 147 - 163.
- Morf, C. C., & Rhodewalt, F. (2001). Unraveling the paradoxes of Narcissism: A dynamic self-regulatory processing model. Psychological Inquiry, 12, 177–196.
- Tschanz, B. T., & Rhodewalt, F. (2001). Autobiography, reputation, and the self: On the role of the evaluative valence and self-consistency of the self-relevant information. Journal of Experimental Social Psychology, 37, 32 - 48.
- Rhodewalt, F., & Edding, S. K. (2002). Narcissis reflects: Memory distortion in response to ego relevant feedback in high and low narcissistic men. Journal of Research in Personality, 36, 97-116.
- Rhodewalt, F., & Tragakis, M. (2002). Self-handicapping and the social self: The costs and rewards of interpersonal self-construction. In J. P. Forgas & K. Williams, (Eds.), The Social Self: Cognitive, Interpersonal, and Intergroup Perspectives (pp. 121–142). New York: Psychology Press.
- Rhodewalt, F., & Vohs, K. D. (2005). Defensive strategies, motivation, and the self: A self-regulatory process view. In A. Elliot & C. Dweck (Eds.), Handbook of Competence and Motivation. New York: Guilford Press.
- Rhodewalt, F., Tragakis, M., & Finnerty, J. (2006). Narcissism and self-handicapping: Linking self-aggrandizement to behavior. Journal of Research in Personality, 40, 573–597.
- Rhodewalt, F. (2006). Possessing and striving for high self-esteem. In M. Kernis (Ed.), Self-Esteem: A Source Book. New York: Psychology Press.
- Rhodewalt, F. (Ed.). (2008). Personality and social behavior. New York: Psychology Press.
