= Florence Denmark =

American psychologist (1932–2026)

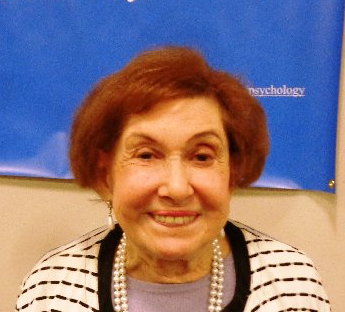
- Born: January 28, 1931; Philadelphia, Pennsylvania, U.S.
- Died: May 25, 2026 (aged 95)
- Education: University of Pennsylvania
- Known for: Past president, American Psychological Association
- Awards: APA Award for Lifetime Contributions to Psychology
- Scientific career
- Fields: Social psychology

Florence Harriet Levin Denmark (January 28, 1931 – May 25, 2026) was an American psychologist and a past president of the American Psychological Association (1980–1981). She was a pioneering female psychologist who influenced the psychological sciences through her scholarly and academic accomplishments in both psychology and feminist movements. She contributed to psychology in several ways, specifically in the field of psychology of women and human rights, both nationally and internationally.

Denmark held academic teaching positions at several colleges, researching social psychology topics regarding women and their social inequalities. Her research emphasized status and gender, prejudice, leadership and leadership styles, and women. Considered to be an important leader in the field, Denmark actively focused on women's issues, including helping and empowering disadvantaged women, dedicating herself to being an influential feminist leader.

== Life and career ==
=== Early life and education ===
Denmark was born in Philadelphia on January 28, 1931, to an attorney and a musician. She grew up with an older sister and a significant extended family. Since childhood, Denmark was academically successful. She was actively involved during her adolescent years at Roxborough High School in Philadelphia and graduated as valedictorian of her high school class In 1948.

Following high school, Denmark studied history and psychology as an undergraduate at the University of Pennsylvania. While at the university, she became a member of Phi Sigma Sigma. She was involved in undergraduate research and wrote an honor's thesis revolving around leadership and gender. Graduating with the first double undergraduate major with honors in 1952, she subsequently went on to continue her graduate studies at the University of Pennsylvania. While she was pursuing her graduate degree, Florence married Stanley Denmark - an orthodontist - in 1953. After Denmark was awarded her PhD in social psychology in 1958, she moved to New York with her husband and they had three children.

=== Early career ===
While living in New York, Denmark accepted an adjunct faculty position at Queens College of the City University of New York. With encouragement from the head of the Queens college psychology program, Denmark accepted a full-time faculty position at Hunter College in 1964. Here, Denmark continued to teach and conduct research until 1988, when she moved to Pace University and became the Robert Scott Pace Distinguished Professor of Psychology and Chair of the Department of Psychology. While at CUNY, Denmark served as the first director of the CUNY SEEK program at Hunter College from 1968 to 1970, and was the Executive Officer of the PhD program in Psychology at CUNY Graduate Center from 1972-1979.

== Professional life and death ==
Denmark made many contributions as well as earned many awards and honors in the field of psychology. Denmark acted as chairperson for the first research conference geared towards women and psychological research and was one of the founding members and later president (1975-1976) of the Society for the Psychology of Women, APA Division 35.

In addition to serving as the 1980 president of the APA, Denmark served as president of the New York State Psychological Association, the Eastern Psychological Association (1985-1986), APA Division 1 (General Psychology), the International Council of Psychologists, and the Psi Chi International Honors Society in Psychology. She served as Vice President of the New York Academy of Sciences and on the board of directors for the Cummings Center for the History of Psychology at the University of Akron.

The Florence L. Denmark Award is awarded by the Psi Chi honor society to the nation's top faculty advisor. The Association for Women in Psychology and APA Divisions 35 and 52 also give annual awards in her honor.

Denmark died on May 25, 2026 in Falls Church, Virginia, at the age of 95.

=== Honors and recognition ===
Her honors and recognition include membership in Phi Beta Theta, Psi Chi, Sigma Xi, and Phi Beta Kappa. Her book Psychology of Women: A Handbook of Issues and Theories (co-edited by Michele Paludi) was selected by the journal Choices as an academic book of excellence.

=== Awards earned ===
In 1987, Denmark received the first APA Award for Distinguished Contributions to Education and Training in Psychology. Other awards include the Distinguished Contributions to Education and Training, Distinguished Contributions to the International Advancement of Psychology, Distinguished Contributions to Psychology in the Public Interest, as well as the APA Centennial Award for Sustained Contributions to the Public Interest Directorate in 1992. In 1991, she received the highest award offered by the Society for the Psychology of Women, the Carolyn Sherif Memorial Lecture Award. In 2002, Denmark was given the Distinguished Faculty Achievement Award from Dyson College of Pace University. She also received awards from the New York State Psychological Association, the Organization for Professional Women, the Association for Women in Science, and the Association for Women in Psychology.

== Involvement with women's issues ==
Denmark made significant strides for the field of psychology in the areas of gender differences and feminism. In her article "Women and Psychology", Denmark explores the gender differences when working in psychology at an international level. She notes that while the gender gap has been lessened in recent years, there is still much room for improvement when it comes to sexism. In other studies, Denmark found that when it comes to roles of higher status, women are also sexist towards women. This, according to Denmark, may also be a symptom of being exposed to sexism and undervaluing of women.

While she has spoken on behalf of women and the feminism movement, she also worked towards defeating the gender bias toward participants in psychological studies. The gender bias in research may have produced inaccurate results in many studies. Denmark's work has helped to provide valid results. Denmark has also published "Guidelines for Avoiding Sexism in Psychological Research" with a few of her colleagues. In this work, Denmark and her colleagues lay out a series of problems that emerge as a result of sexism in experimental psychology. Then, they laid out examples of what the problems might have looked like in psychology studies, and they suggested ways to solve the problems. It is important that in research, the processes that are used to select participants and the processes used to analyze the data are equal when it comes to sexes. When sexism plays a part in these processes, there is a high likelihood that sex differences are not included in the results, which could greatly affect treatment options.

In addition to her work with women's issues, Denmark also did work looking into the effects of labeling, such as labelling someone as an immigrant, along with racial integration in school. Her work has spanned decades, looking into the psychological effect of different situations on women as they mature through life.

Denmark wrote over 15 books, over 100 articles, and appeared on radio and television shows.
