= C. Anderson Johnson =

American academic

C. Anderson (Andy) Johnson is University Professor at Claremont Graduate University (CGU) in Claremont, California. He was Founding Dean of the CGU School of Community and Global Health and served in that capacity from 2008 to 2013 when he assumed the position of CEO of the Community Translational Research Institute (CTRI), a not-for-profit research and education corporation headquartered in Riverside California. CTRI links public health, medical and health administration schools and departments at CGU, UC Riverside, Loma Linda University, and the University of La Verne with public health, health care and other community based institutions in Southern California, including the County of Riverside, the Inland Empire Health Plan, and municipalities, school systems and NGO's in the region for translating health promotion and disease prevention science into public policy and practice. His teaching in population health and prevention science at CGU links faculty and students with the practice of translational research.

Prior to his arrival at CGU, Johnson was founding director of the Institute for Health Promotion & Disease Prevention Research (IPR), and Sidney Garfield Professor of Health Sciences and Professor of Preventive Medicine & Psychology at the University of Southern California (USC).

Johnson earned his B.A. in Psychology and Ph.D. in Social Psychology with a minor emphasis in Neuroscience from Duke University. Prior to his arrival at USC he did postdoctoral work in environmental psychology at the National Bureau of Standards and held a faculty position at the University of Minnesota. His research contributions include mechanisms of action in community-based approaches to tobacco-, alcohol-, and drug-abuse prevention.

His recent research has focused on social and cultural change acting in combination with genetically and environmentally driven dispositional characteristics to influence health risk behaviors, including socio-cultural and dispositional interactions influencing the effectiveness of smoking and alcohol abuse prevention programs. He is the founding director of the China Seven Cities Study, a longitudinal study of tobacco use and lifestyles in seven of China’s largest cities.

== Selected publications ==
- Johnson, C. A., Unger, J. B., Ritt-Olson, A., Palmer, P. H., Cen, S. Y., Gallaher, P., & Chou, C.-P. (2005). Smoking prevention for ethnically diverse adolescents: 2-year outcomes of a multicultural, school-based smoking prevention curriculum in Southern California. Preventive Medicine, 40(6), 842-852.
- Nezami, E., Unger, J., Tan, S., Mahaffey, C., Ritt-Olson, A., Sussman, S., Nguyen-Michel, S., Baezconde-Garbanati, L., Azen, S., & Johnson, C. A. (2005). The influence of depressive symptoms on experimental smoking and intention to smoke in a diverse youth sample. Nicotine & Tobacco Research, 7(2), 243-248.
- Ritt-Olson, A., Unger, J. B., Valente, T., Nezami, E., Chou, C.-P., Trinidad, D. R., Milam, J., Tan, S., & Johnson, C. A. (2005). Exploring peers as a mediator of the association between depression and smoking in young adolescents. Substance Use & Misuse, 40(1), 77-98.
- Shakib, S., Zheng, H., Johnson, C. A., Chen, X., Sun, P., Palmer, P. H., Yan, L., Jie, G., & Unger, J. B. (2005). Family characteristics and smoking among urban and rural adolescents living in China. Preventive Medicine, 40(1), 83-91.
- Unger, J. B., Chou, C.-P., Palmer, P. H., Ritt-Olson, A., Gallaher, P., Cen, S., Lichtman, K., Azen, S., & Johnson, C. A. (2004). Project FLAVOR: 1-year outcomes of a multicultural, school-based smoking prevention curriculum for adolescents. American Journal of Public Health, 94(2), 263-265.
