= Game theory in communication networks =

Game theory has been used as a tool for modeling and studying interactions between cognitive radios envisioned to operate in future communications systems. Such terminals will have the capability to adapt to the context they operate in, through possibly power and rate control as well as channel selection. Software agents embedded in these terminals will potentially be selfish, meaning they will only try to maximize the throughput/connectivity of the terminal they function for, as opposed to maximizing the welfare (total capacity) of the system they operate in. Thus, the potential interactions among them can be modeled through non-cooperative games. The researchers in this field often strive to determine the stable operating points of systems composed of such selfish terminals, and try to come up with a minimum set of rules (etiquette) so as to make sure that the optimality loss compared to a cooperative – centrally controlled setting – is kept at a minimum.

== Applications of non-cooperative game theory in wireless networks research ==
Game theory is the study of strategic decision making. More formally, it is "the study of mathematical models of conflict and cooperation between intelligent rational decision-makers." An alternative term suggested "as a more descriptive name for the discipline" is interactive decision theory. Game theory is mainly used in economics, political science, and psychology, as well as logic and biology. The subject first addressed zero-sum games, such that one person's gains exactly equal net losses of the other participant(s). Today, however, game theory applies to a wide range of class relations, and has developed into an umbrella term for the logical side of science, to include both human and non-humans, like computers. Classic uses include a sense of balance in numerous games, where each person has found or developed a tactic that cannot successfully better his results, given the other approach. Game theory has been used extensively in wireless networks research to develop understanding of stable operation points for networks made of autonomous/selfish nodes. The nodes are considered as the players. Utility functions are often chosen to correspond to achieved connection rate or similar technical metrics. The studies done in this context can be grouped as below:

=== Medium access games for 802.11 WLAN ===
Various studies have analyzed radio resource management problems in 802.11 WLAN networks. In such random access studies, researchers have considered selfish nodes, who try to maximize their own utility (throughput) only, and control their channel access probabilities to maximize their utilities.

=== Power control games in CDMA systems ===
Power control refers to the process through which mobiles in CDMA cellular settings adjust their transmission powers so that they do not create unnecessary interference to other mobiles, trying, nevertheless, to achieve the required quality of service. Power control can be centralized in nature, where the base station dictates and assigns transmitter power levels to mobiles based on their link qualities, or they can be distributed, in which mobiles update their powers autonomously, independent of the base station, based on perceived service quality. In such distributed settings, the mobiles can be considered to be selfish agents (players) who try to maximize their utilities (often modeled as corresponding throughputs). Game theory is considered to be a powerful tool to study such scenarios.

== Applications of cooperative game theory (coalitions) in wireless networks research ==
=== Coalitional game theory in wireless networks ===
Coalitional game theory is a branch of game theory that deals with cooperative behavior. In a coalitional game, the key idea is to study the formation of cooperative groups, i.e., coalitions among a number of players. By cooperating, the players can strengthen their position in a given game as well as improve their utilities. In this context, coalitional game theory proves to be a powerful tool for modeling cooperative behavior in many wireless networking applications such as cognitive radio networks, wireless system, physical layer security, virtual MIMO, among others.

== See also ==
- Mesh networking
