= Jane Halonen =

American educational psychologist (born 1950)

- Occupation: Professor of Psychology
- Awards: APF Charles L. Brewer Distinguished Teaching of Psychology Award (2000); APA Award for Distinguished Contributions of Applications of Psychology to Education and Training (2013); • Psi Chi Distinguished Member (2021)

Academic background
- Education: Butler University; University of Wisconsin–Milwaukee.

Jane Simmons Halonen (born July 14, 1950) is an American clinical psychologist whose career has focused on advancing the scholarship of teaching and learning in psychology. She holds the position of Professor of Psychology at the University of West Florida where she also served as Dean of the College of Arts and Sciences from 2003 to 2012. Halonen is a contributing writer for The Chronicle of Higher Education.

== Biography ==
Halonen was raised in South Bend, IN. She completed her bachelor's in psychology at Butler University. She attended graduate school at University of Wisconsin-Milwaukee where she obtained her master's degree in psychology and doctorate in clinical psychology. As a graduate student, Halonen worked with Richard H. Passman on studies of infants' attachment to pacifiers and other objects. Halonen completed her postdoctoral clinical internship at Chicago Read Mental Health Center.

Halonen began her academic career in 1981 at Alverno College where she taught for 17 years. During this time, she became known for her work on developing students' critical thinking skills. Halonen moved to James Madison University in 1998 where she stayed for 5 years before moving to the University of West Florida.

Halonen has served terms as the president of the Society for the Teaching of Psychology (2000) and the president of the Council for the Teachers of Undergraduate Psychology. She served as the chief reader for the Advanced Placement (AP) Psychology Test from 2004 to 2009. Halonen helped the American Psychological Association (APA) develop guidelines and standards on academic performance from high school through graduate levels of education. She participated in the APA Summits on National Assessment in Psychology, and chaired the committee that produced the APA Guidelines for the Undergraduate Psychology Major (Version 2.0) in 2013.

Halonen's academic interests focus on student learning and critical thinking skills, assessing undergraduate programs to help them improve, and helping the public understand the discipline of psychology. She has led national efforts to assess student learning outcomes in introductory psychology and has worked with others to define steps that psychology programs can take to develop a culture of learning outcomes assessment that improves teaching and learning.

== Awards ==
Halonen received the APA Award for Distinguished Contributions of Applications of Psychology to Education and Training in 2013. She previously won the American Psychological Foundation's Charles L. Brewer Distinguished Teaching of Psychology Award in 2000, and in 2003, was named an "Eminent Woman in Psychology" by the APA.

Since 2009, the Society for the Teaching of Psychology (APA Division 2) has awarded the Jane S. Halonen Teaching Excellence Award to Early Career Psychologists as a tribute to her mentorship of new faculty at early stages of their careers in psychology.

== Books ==
- Dunn, D. S., & Halonen, J. S. (2016). The psychology major's companion: Everything you need to know to get where you want to go. Macmillan Higher Education.
- Dunn, D. S., McCarthy, M. A., Baker, S. C., & Halonen, J. S. (2010). Using quality benchmarks for assessing and developing undergraduate programs. John Wiley & Sons.
- Halonen, J. S., & Gray, C. (2001). The critical thinking companion for introductory psychology. Macmillan.
- Halonen, J. S., & Santrock, J. W. (1996). Psychology: Contexts of behavior. Brown & Benchmark Publishers.
- Halonen, J. S., & Santrock, J. W. (1999). Psychology contexts & applications. McGraw-Hill.
- Halonen, J. S., Smith, R. A., Dunn, D. S. (2009). Teaching critical thinking in psychology: A handbook of best practices. John Wiley & Sons.

== Representative publications ==
- Chew, S. L., Halonen, J. S. (2018). Practice what we teach: Improving teaching and learning in Psychology. Teaching of Psychology, 45(3), 239–245.
- Halonen, J. S. (1995). Demystifying critical thinking. Teaching of Psychology, 22(1), 75–81.
- Halonen, J. S., Bosack, T., Clay, S., McCarthy, M., Dunn, D. S., Hill IV, G. W., ... & Whitlock, K. (2003). A rubric for learning, teaching, and assessing scientific inquiry in psychology. Teaching of Psychology, 30(3), 196–208.
- Halonen, J. S., Whitlock, K., & Arena, L. (2021). The introductory psychology course in the 21st century: The challenge of finding common ground. Scholarship of Teaching and Learning in Psychology, 7(3), 192–205.
