= Polar ice cap =

High-latitude region of an astronomical body with major parts covered in ice

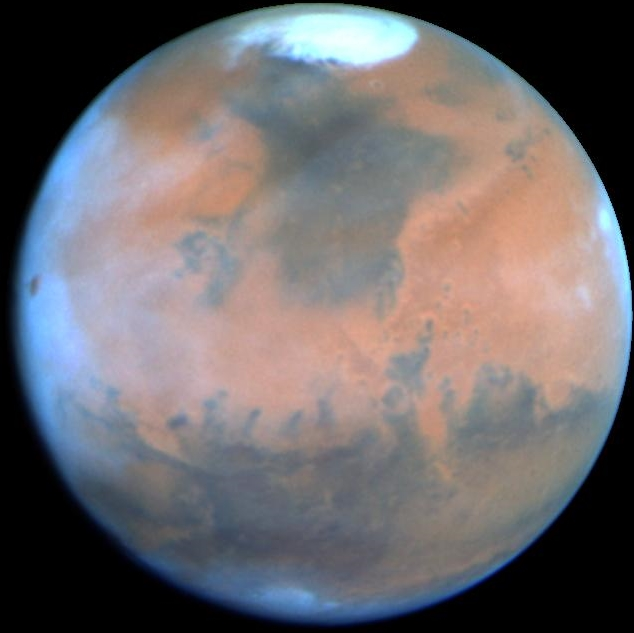
The polar ice caps on Mars, with the entire north one visible, as imaged through the Hubble Space Telescope

A polar ice cap or polar cap is a high-latitude region of a planet, dwarf planet, or natural satellite that is covered in ice.

There are no requirements with respect to size or composition for a body of ice to be termed a polar ice cap, nor any geological requirement for it to be over land, but only that it must be a body of solid phase matter in the polar region. This causes the term "polar ice cap" to be something of a misnomer, as the term ice cap itself is applied more narrowly to bodies that are over land, and cover less than 50,000 km^{2}: larger bodies are referred to as ice sheets.

The composition of the ice will vary. For example, Earth's polar caps are mainly water ice, whereas Mars's polar ice caps are a mixture of solid carbon dioxide and water ice.

Polar ice caps form because high-latitude regions receive less energy in the form of solar radiation from the Sun than equatorial regions, resulting in lower surface temperatures.

Earth's polar caps have changed dramatically over the last 12,000 years. Seasonal variations of the ice caps takes place due to varied solar energy absorption as the planet or moon revolves around the Sun. Additionally, in geologic time scales, the ice caps may grow or shrink due to climate change.

== Earth ==
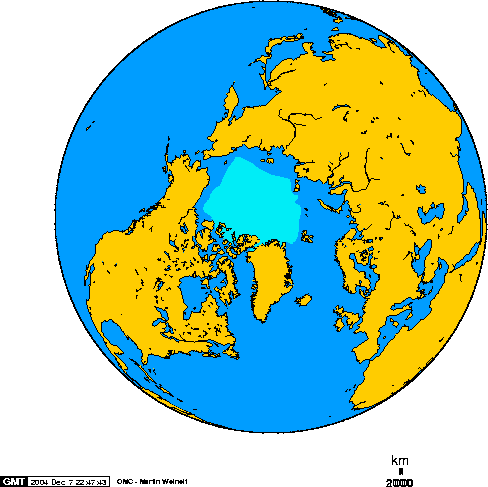
Extent of the Arctic sea-ice in September 1978 – 2002

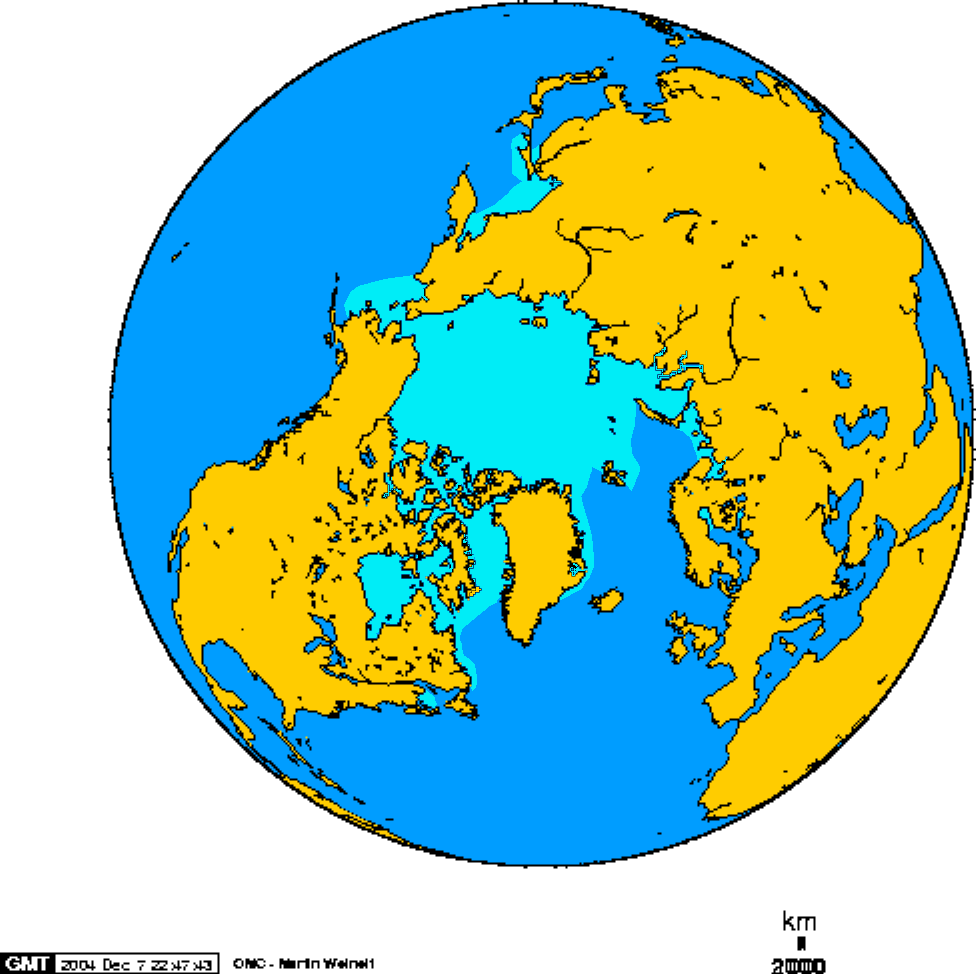
Extent of the Arctic sea-ice in February 1978 – 2002

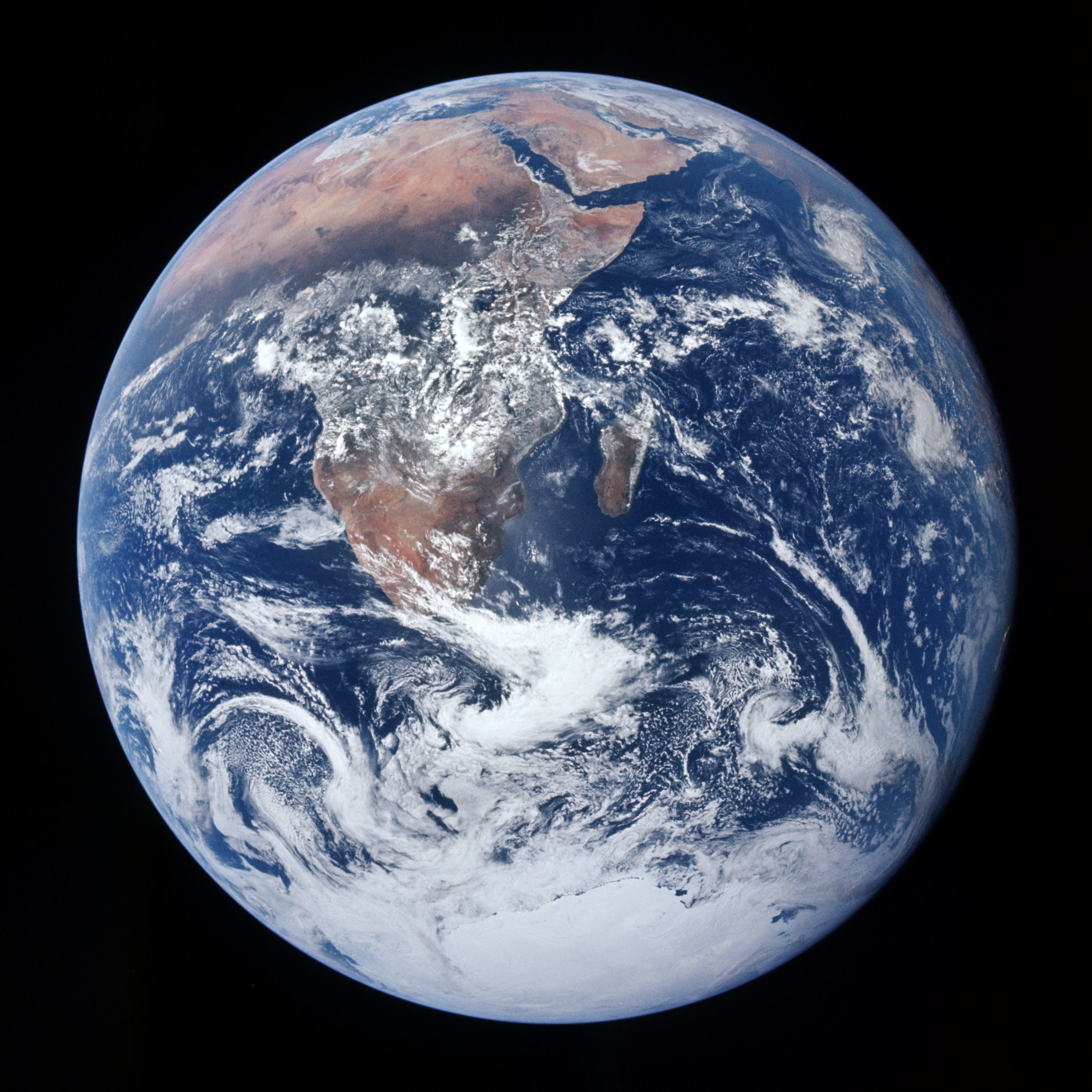
The Blue Marble, Earth as seen from Apollo 17 with the southern polar ice cap visible (courtesy NASA)

=== North Polar ice cap melting ===
Earth's North Pole is covered by floating pack ice (sea ice) over the Arctic Ocean. Portions of the ice that do not melt seasonally can get very thick, up to 3–4 meters thick over large areas, with ridges up to 20 meters thick. One-year ice is usually about 1 meter thick. The area covered by sea ice ranges between 9 and 12 million km^{2}. In addition, the Greenland ice sheet covers about 1.71 million km^{2} and contains about 2.6 million km^{3} of ice. When the ice breaks off (calves) it forms icebergs scattered around the northern Atlantic.

According to the National Snow and Ice Data Center, "since 1979, winter Arctic ice extent has decreased about 4.2 percent per decade". Both 2008 and 2009 had a minimum Arctic sea ice extent somewhat above that of 2007. At other times of the year the ice extent is still sometimes near the 1979–2000 average, as in April 2010, by the data from the National Snow and Ice Data Center. Still, between these same years, the overall average ice coverage appears to have declined from 8 million km^{2} to 5 million km^{2}.

=== South Pole ===
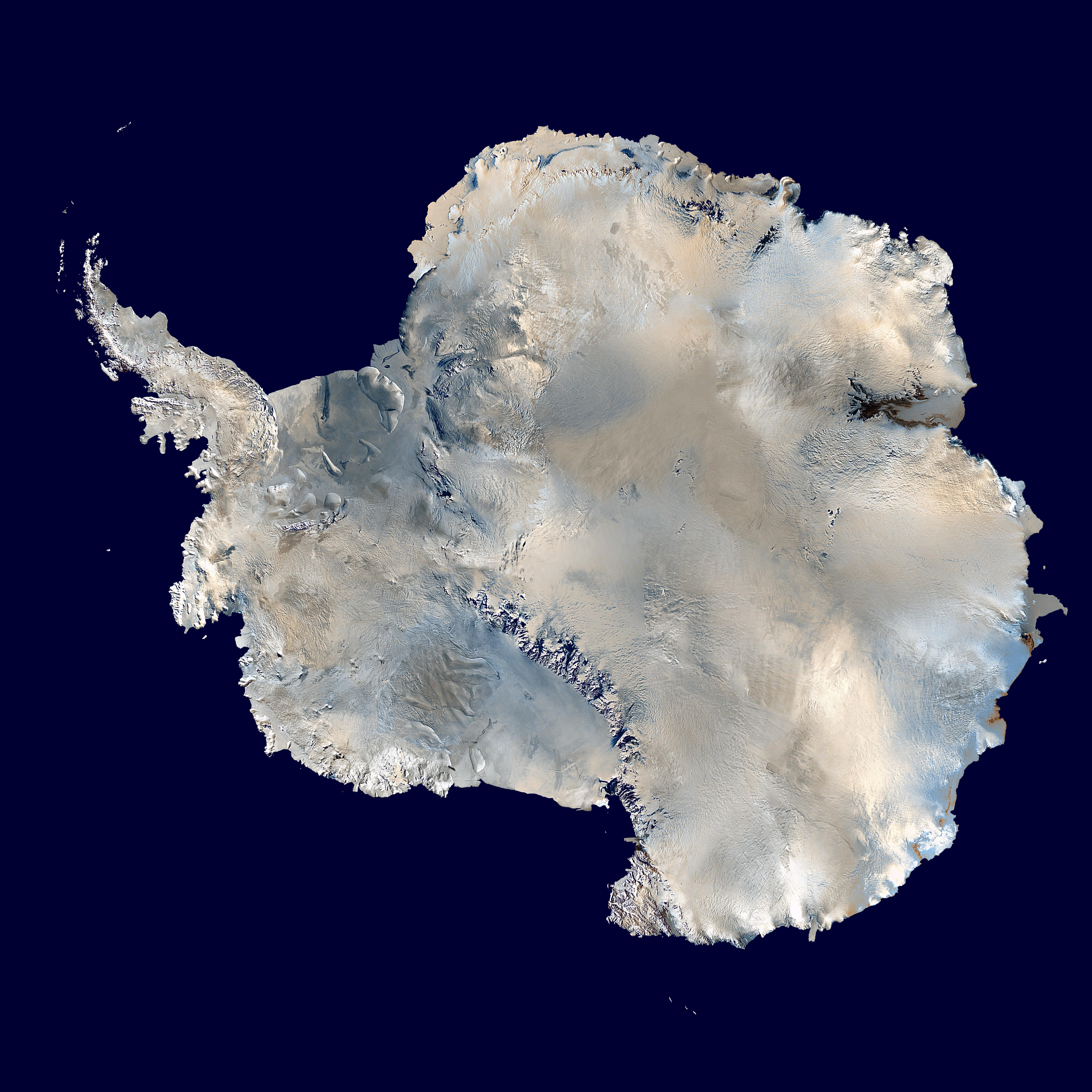
A satellite composite image of Antarctica

Earth's south polar land mass, Antarctica, is covered by the Antarctic ice sheet. It covers an area of about 14.6 million km^{2} and contains between 25 and 30 million km^{3} of ice. Around 70% of the fresh water on Earth is contained in this ice sheet.

Data from the National Snow and Ice Data Center shows that the sea ice coverage of Antarctica has a slightly positive trend over the last three decades (1979–2009).

=== Historical cases ===
Over the past several decades, Earth's polar ice caps have gained significant attention because of the alarming decrease in land and sea ice. NASA reports that since the late 1970s, the Arctic has lost an average of 20,800 square miles (53,900 square kilometres) of sea ice per year while the Antarctic has gained an average of 7,300 square miles (18,900 km^{2}) of sea ice per year. At the same time, the Arctic has been losing around 50 cubic kilometres (gigatons) of land ice per year, almost entirely from Greenland's 2.6 million gigaton sheet. On 19 September 2014, for the first time since 1979, Antarctic sea ice extent exceeded 7.72 million square miles (20 million square kilometres), according to the National Snow and Ice Data Center (NSIDC). The ice extent stayed above this benchmark extent for several days. The average maximum extent between 1981 and 2010 was 7.23 million square miles (18.72 million square kilometres). The single-day maximum extent in 2014 was reached on 20 Sep, according to NSIDC data, when the sea ice covered 7.78 million square miles (20.14 million square kilometres). The 2014 five-day average maximum was reached on 22 Sep, when sea ice covered 7.76 million square miles (20.11 million square kilometres), according to NSIDC. This increase could be due to the reduction in the salinity of the Antarctic Ocean as a result of the previous melting of the ice sheet, by increasing the freezing point of the seawater.

The current rate of decline of the ice caps has caused many investigations and discoveries on glacier dynamics and their influence on the world's climate. In the early 1950s, scientists and engineers from the US Army began drilling into polar ice caps for geological insight. These studies resulted in "nearly forty years of research experience and achievements in deep polar ice core drillings... and established the fundamental drilling technology for retrieving deep ice cores for climatologic archives." Polar ice caps have been used to track current climate patterns but also patterns over the past several thousands years from the traces of CO_{2} and CH_{4} found trapped in the ice. In the past decade, polar ice caps have shown their most rapid decline in size with no true sign of recovery. Josefino Comiso, a senior research scientist at NASA, found that the "rate of warming in the Arctic over the last 20 years is eight times the rate of warming over the last 100 years." In September 2012, sea ice reached its smallest size ever. Journalist John Vidal stated that sea ice is "700,000 sq km below the previous minimum of 4.17m sq km set in 2007". In August 2013, Arctic sea ice extent averaged 6.09m km^{2}, which represents 1.13 million km^{2} below the 1981–2010 average for that month.

== Mars ==
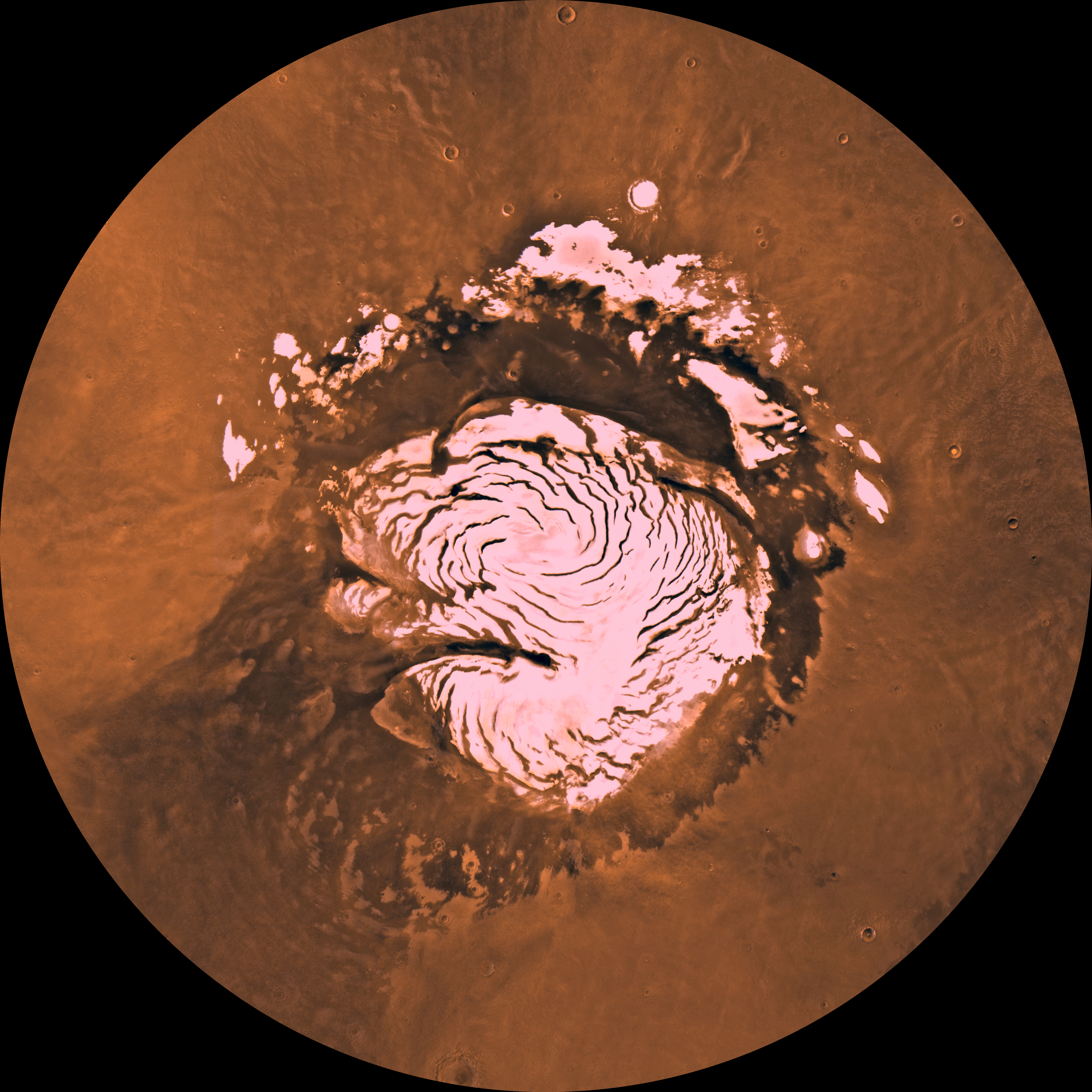
Mars's north polar region with ice cap, composite of Viking 1 orbiter images (Courtesy NASA/JPL-Caltech)

In addition to Earth, the planet Mars also has polar ice caps. They consist of primarily water-ice with a few percent dust. Frozen carbon dioxide makes up a small permanent portion of the Planum Australe or the South Polar Layered Deposits. In both hemispheres a seasonal carbon dioxide frost deposits in the winter and sublimates during the spring.

Data collected in 2001 from NASA missions to Mars show that the southern residual ice cap undergoes sublimation inter-annually. The most widely accepted explanation is that fluctuations in the planet's orbit are causing the changes.

== Pluto ==
On 29 April 2015, NASA stated that its New Horizons missions had discovered a feature thought to be a polar ice cap on the dwarf planet Pluto. The probe's flyby of Pluto in July 2015 allowed the Alice ultraviolet imaging spectrometer to confirm that the feature was in fact an ice cap composed of methane and nitrogen ices.

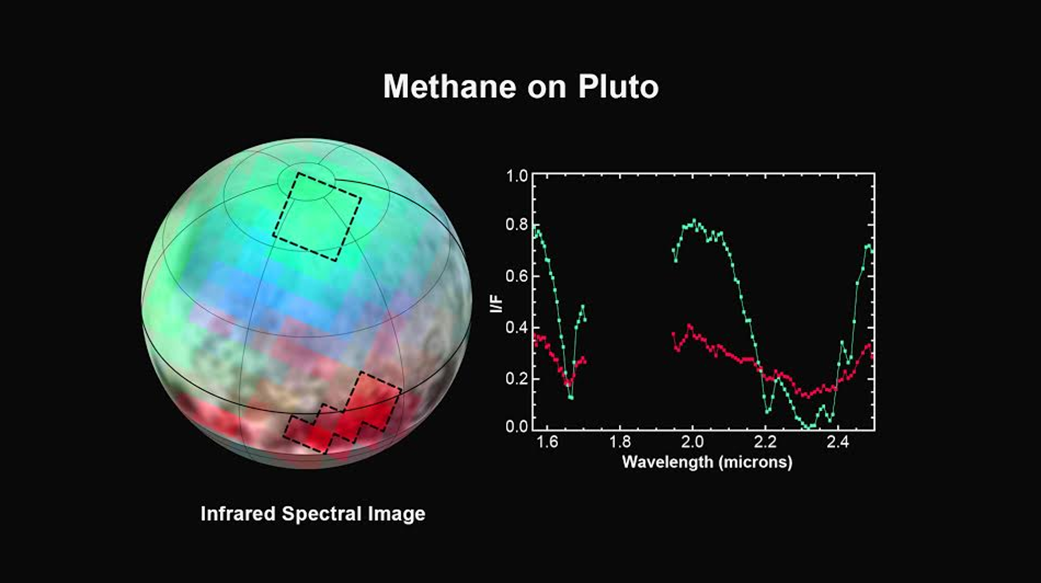
A photo describing the frozen methane and nitrogen on Pluto gathered from New Horizons

== See also ==
- Cryosphere
- Ice age
- Polar climate
