= Josefino Comiso =

Sea ice specialist and climate scientist

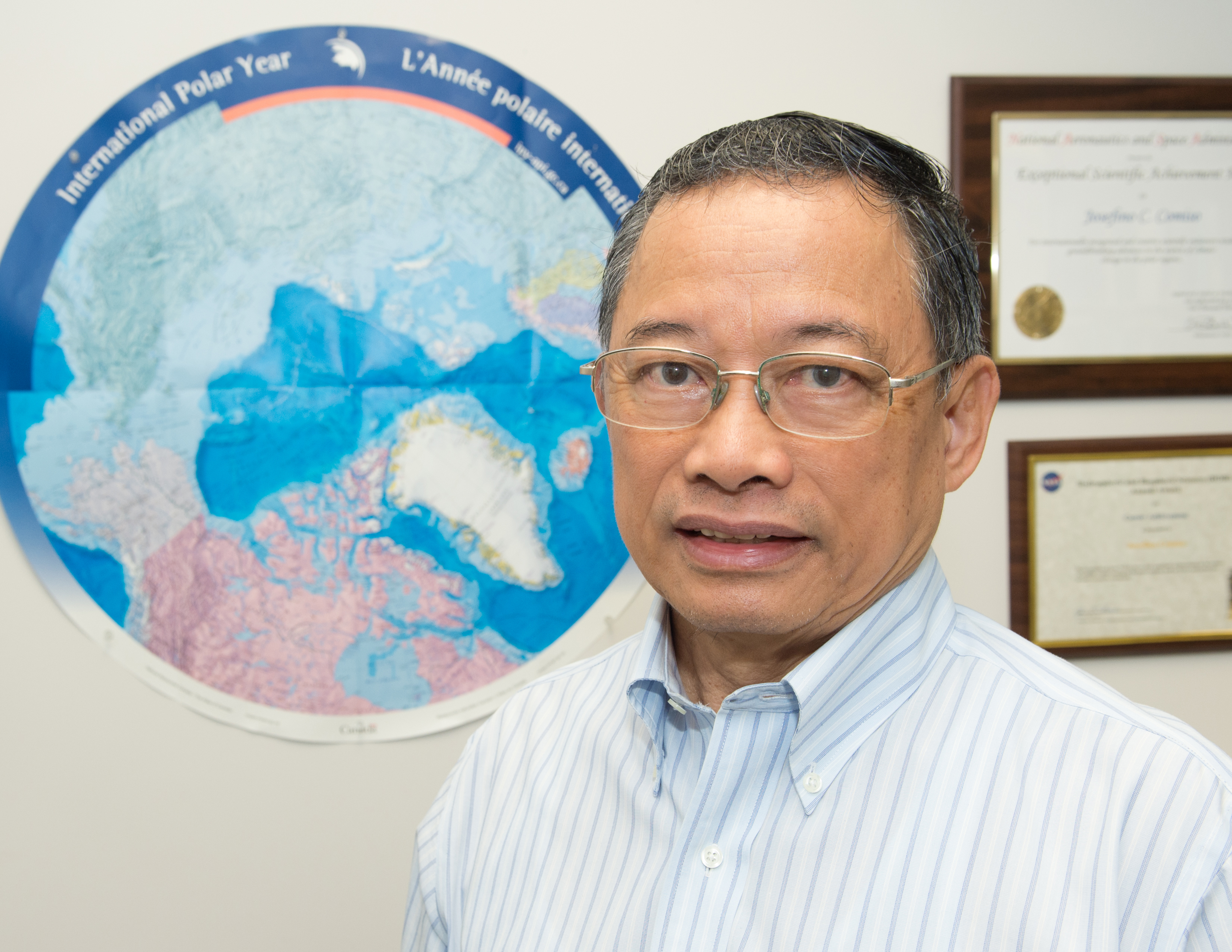
- Comiso circa 2015
- Born: September 21, 1940 (age 85); Narvacan, Commonwealth of the Philippines
- Other name: Joey Comiso
- Education: University of the Philippines (BS); Florida State University (MS); University of California, Los Angeles (PhD)
- Occupations: Sea ice specialist and climate scientist
- Employers: NASA Goddard Space Flight Center; University of the Philippines Diliman
- Notable work: IPCC AR5
- Scientific career
- Thesis: A measurement of π⁻ + proton → neutron + γ differential cross sections near the P₃₃(1232) resonance to test the ΔI ≤ 1 rule and time reversal invariance (1972)

Josefino Cacas Comiso (born September 21, 1940) is a Filipino-born Emeritus Scientist at NASA's Goddard Space Flight Center. He served as a research scientist for 38 years, conducting fieldwork in Antarctica, the Arctic, Alaska, and Greenland. He has authored more than 150 peer-reviewed journal articles and eight books, and was a coordinating lead author for Working Group I of the Intergovernmental Panel on Climate Change's Fifth Assessment Report (2013–2014). His specialties include polar oceanography, sea ice, climate change, and satellite remote sensing.

== Early life ==
Josefino "Joey" Comiso was born on September 21, 1940, in the barangay of San Antonio, within Narvacan, Ilocos Sur, in northern Luzon, Philippines. He was the seventh of ten children in a large family. His father, Severino, was a businessman and merchant, and his mother, Silvestra, helped raise the family. Although his parents were poorly educated, all of the children attended college. The family was religious and actively involved in the Methodist Church, a Protestant denomination that was a minority in the predominantly Roman Catholic region.

Comiso grew up without scientific role models, but two early events as a child changed his outlook and path. In one incident, residents of his community observed an aircraft contrail in the sky and interpreted it as a sign from God of the end of the world. They later learned that it was the first sighting of commercial aircraft in their area. This experience made Comiso curious about science and introduced him to scientific thinking for the first time.

Reading biographies of scientists, he developed the ambition to become a missionary physician like Albert Schweitzer. This goal was interrupted by a serious car accident just after high school. He suffered a complex fracture of the femur, which required a long, two-year recovery time. After spending many months in a hospital, he was visited one day by a Bannawag journalist who gave him some helpful advice about not giving up. (Note: Advice from the Bannawag reporter: "There are times in life when you slip and fall while climbing a ladder. But when you climb a ladder again you will be a lot more careful and will be able to reach heights you never dream of ever reaching.") These words would continue to motivate him (Note: "I thought that was a very profound statement, and I kept his word and remembered it for the rest of my life." [...] "The jeep accident was unfortunate but it made me [change] my career goal for the better. I am more than ever convinced that the advice of the Bannawag Reporter made a difference because it made me pursue difficult research projects that I would not have done and some people would have abandoned as well".) throughout his life and career.

== Education ==
He entered the University of the Philippines (UP) in Quezon City while still on crutches from the car accident. Unsure of a field of study, he consulted an academic advisor and learned that he had an aptitude for physics and math. He chose to study physics and earned a BS degree in 1962. After graduation, he joined the newly opened Philippine Atomic Research Center, where he conducted research on neutron diffraction under Quirino Navarro. He also continued to teach physics at UP at the direction of Melecio Magno.

San Antonio, Narvacan, Ilocos Sur, Northern Luzon, Philippines

Comiso was unable to perform his work at the new research center because the neutron beam was not yet operational. He instead decided to pursue graduate studies in the United States. He enrolled at Florida State University in Tallahassee, where he studied fundamental particle physics under the supervision of John Albright and received a MS in physics (1966).

Continuing his studies, Comiso entered a doctoral program in particle physics at the University of California, Los Angeles, where he completed a dissertation on time reversal invariance in electromagnetic interaction. His experimental work was conducted at Lawrence Berkeley Laboratory, and he received his PhD in 1972. He was then offered a postdoctoral fellowship at the University of Virginia (UVA), where he worked in experimental particle physics using data from the synchrocyclotron at Lawrence Berkeley Laboratory, the NASA Synchrocyclotron Facility, and the Los Alamos Meson Physics Facility. At UVA, Comiso worked on pion-capture experiments and studies of pion–nucleon scattering.

== Career ==
Although trained as a particle physicist, Comiso's career shifted toward Earth observation and remote sensing while working as a senior consultant at the Computer Sciences Corporation, which supported programs at NASA's Goddard Space Flight Center. After a few months, his work attracted the attention of H. Jay Zwally, the leader of Goddard's Cryospheric Sciences Laboratory, who recruited him to join the group. He joined NASA in September 1979. At Goddard, he showed how satellite-based passive microwave and infrared remote sensing data for studying oceanic and atmospheric processes can be used to observe and analyze changes in sea ice, ocean conditions, and climate from space.

=== Sea ice atlases ===
Zwally and his team advanced the use of ocean-radar altimetry (Note: H. Jay Zwally came to Goddard in 1974. He and his team built the Cryospheric Sciences Laboratory, where they "pioneered the use of ocean-radar altimetry for mapping ice sheet topography and studies of mass balance. They developed a comprehensive map of sea ice freeboard and thickness, and discovered the melt-acceleration effect on the flow of the polar ice sheets such as the one on Greenland—which became indicators of the health of the polar ice covers and served as the bellwether of the changing climate.") for mapping ice sheets. Zwally asked Comiso to join their project, and together with Claire Parkinson and other authors, he collaborated on the first atlas based on comprehensive satellite-based observations of Antarctic sea ice using passive microwave radiometry from the Electrically Scanning Microwave Radiometer (ESMR) aboard the Nimbus 5 satellite. The Nimbus program of spacecraft used sensors to map polar sea ice concentration, and Zwally's team used these observations to study the role of polar sea ice in global climate. The 1983 atlas was the first of three sea ice atlases (Note: Antarctic Sea Ice, 1973–1976 (1983), Arctic Sea Ice, 1973-1976 (1987), and Arctic and Antarctic Sea Ice, 1978-1987 (1992).) to which Comiso contributed, followed by two others published in 1987 and 1992.

=== Weddell Polynya ===
In the 1980s, Comiso began doing fieldwork in Antarctica, the Arctic, Alaska, and Greenland. He was especially interested in polynyas, an area of open water or thin ice surrounded by sea ice in the polar regions, typically formed by oceanic heat or wind-driven ice movement. It was initially observed from 1974 to 1976, but the processes were unknown. Major research of the polynya question began in earnest by 1981. Comiso studied the Weddell Polynya in the Southern Ocean around Antarctica, an unusual, ice-free region in the Weddell Sea. His work took place over several years aboard the RV Polarstern, a German research icebreaker operated by the Alfred Wegener Institute for Polar and Marine Research. In 1986, he took measurements using microwave radiometers similar to those used on satellites in the Nimbus program, making note of sea ice thickness and temperature in the region.

A popular article in Scientific American and coverage by the Associated Press widely publicized his findings on the polynya in 1989. That same year, while working outside the RV Polarstern taking measurements on an ice floe, Comiso had a close call. One of his legs stepped into a hole in the ice that was covered with snow, and his entire leg disappeared into the ocean. "Luckily, the hole was small and only one of my legs plunged in", he recalled. "Otherwise, with my heavy winter clothes, I would have plunged into the cold ocean which was more than three kilometers deep." He was asked to return to Antarctica in 1992 but passed on the opportunity, sending a graduate student instead.

=== Aircraft/Submarine Sea Ice Project ===
Comiso also helped demonstrate that sea-ice thickness could be estimated remotely from measurements of the ice surface. In 1987, he led NASA's portion of the submarine overflight experiment in the Arctic, along with team member Peter Wadhams of the Scott Polar Research Institute at the University of Cambridge. The larger project, officially named the Aircraft/Submarine Sea Ice Project (ASSIP), involved sea ice measurements taken from a British submarine and two planes from the U.S. and Canada. By comparing aircraft measurements of the ice surface with submarine measurements of the ice underside, the project showed that sea-ice thickness could be estimated from laser measurements of surface topography. The technique later became an important tool for monitoring climate change.

=== Climate change ===
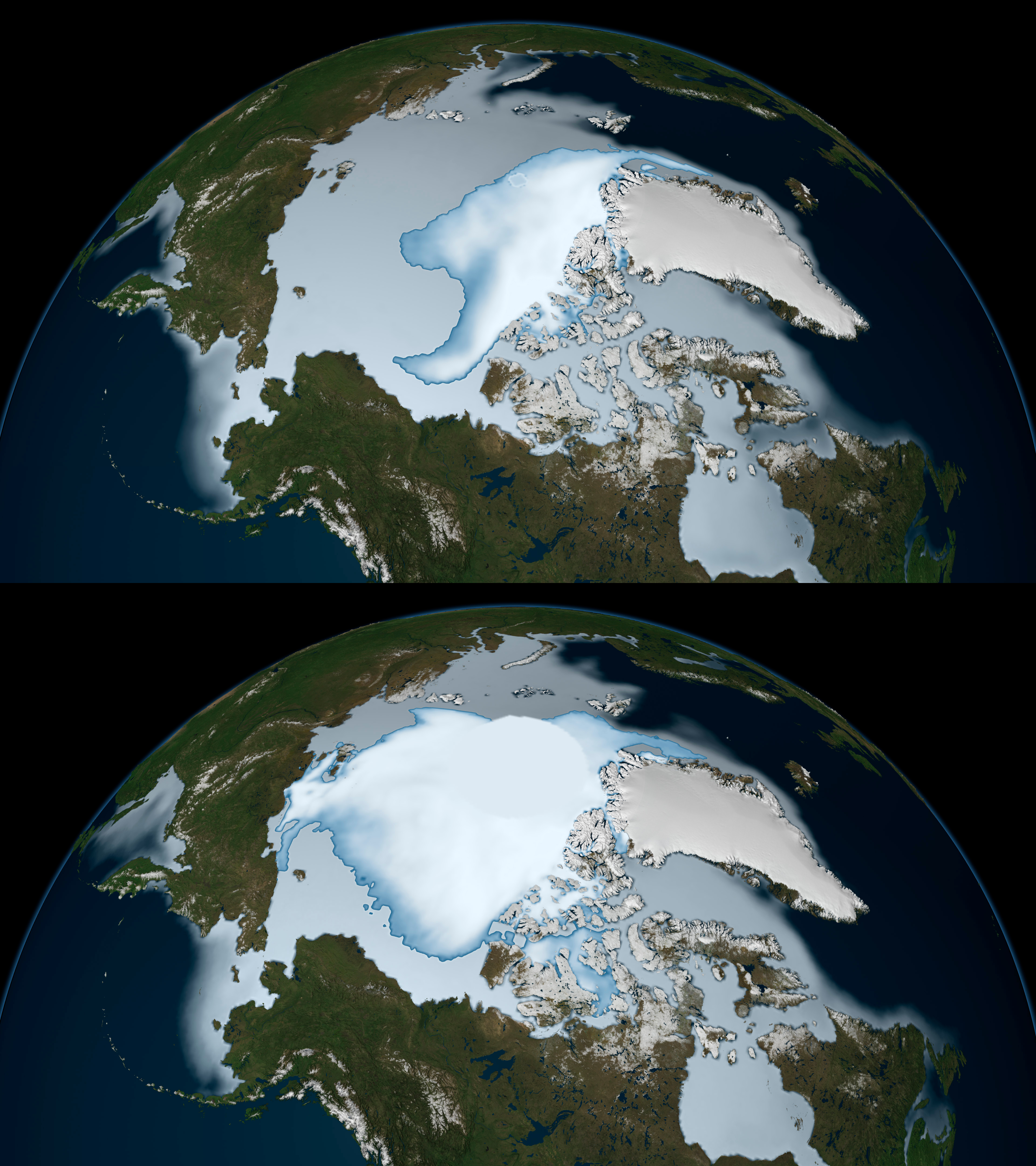
This series of images shows arctic sea ice disappearing from 1980 (bottom) to 2012 (top). Multi-year ice is shown in bright white, while average sea ice cover is shown in light blue to milky white. The image was created from data obtained from Nimbus 7 and the Defense Meteorological Satellite Program.

Comiso contributed to the development of the Bootstrap sea ice concentration algorithm in passive microwave remote sensing, which has been widely used in climate data sets. The algorithm was originally developed for processing data from the Nimbus 7 Scanning Multichannel Microwave Radiometer (SMMR) and later adapted for use with the Special Sensor Microwave/Imager (SSM/I).

Comiso's climate research reached a wider audience through coverage in The New York Times. The newspaper covered his studies of retreating sea ice in the Bellingshausen Sea and its effects on animals and plants in 1993, increasing temperatures in Greenland in 2004, and accelerated summer melting of Arctic Ocean sea ice linked to greenhouse gases in 2006.

That same year, Comiso was a guest professor at Chiba University and a fellow of the Japan Society for the Promotion of Science. In 2007, at the annual meeting of the American Geophysical Union, he reported that a tipping point in the climate system for perennial Arctic sea ice had "likely already been reached". The following year, zoologist George Durner of the United States Geological Survey (USGS) used Comiso's sea-ice data to monitor polar bear habitat in Alaska's Beaufort Sea, where declining summer sea ice raised concerns about the long-term survival of the species.

In an article published in the Journal of Climate in 2012, Comiso reported that the oldest and thickest sea ice in the Arctic was disappearing rapidly. His analysis found that multiyear ice was declining by about -15% to -17% per decade, while perennial ice was decreasing more slowly at roughly -12% to -13% per decade, indicating an overall thinning and weakening of the Arctic sea ice pack. The next year, Comiso began serving as a coordinating lead author with glaciologist David Vaughan for Chapter 4 on the observations of the Cryosphere for Working Group I of the Intergovernmental Panel on Climate Change's Fifth Assessment Report (2013–2014). The drafting process involved several years of revisions. The report concluded that the climate system is undeniably warming, and human activity is influencing climate conditions across most parts of the world. In a later chapter written for the International Encyclopedia of Geography, Comiso called for "strong mitigation measures through reduced greenhouse gas emissions...to stabilize surface temperature and reduce warming".

=== Retirement ===
After 38 years as a NASA research scientist specializing in polar oceanography, sea ice, climate change, and satellite remote sensing, Comiso retired in 2017. He continues to perform research, especially in the Philippines, in the areas of drought risk and forest degradation and restoration. Comiso is the author of eight books and more than 150 peer-reviewed journal articles. As of 2026, Comiso has been cited more than 54,000 times and has an all-time h-index of 88 and an i10-index of 189. He is a Senior Emeritus Scientist at the Cryospheric Sciences Laboratory of the NASA Goddard Space Flight Center and Adjunct Faculty at the Institute of Environmental Science and Meteorology (IESM), University of the Philippines Diliman, where he teaches remote sensing and mentors graduate students.

== Philippines-related work ==
Comiso is a co-founder of the Philippine-American Academy of Science and Engineering (PAASE). He also contributed to the Philippine Remote Sensing Society (PRSS). Comiso was a participant in the Balik Scientist Program (BSP), a government program to promote Filipino scientists to return to the Philippines to share their knowledge.

== Personal life ==
Comiso married his wife Diana in 1970 while working on his doctorate at Lawrence Berkeley Laboratory. His wife is originally from Davao City where she became a registered nurse. She received her master's from Georgetown University and became a director of nursing and president of her local nursing association. In the front matter for his book Polar Oceans from Space (2010), Comiso honors his wife, noting that she taught him "the warmth and joy of living". They have three children, two sons and one daughter. His two sons studied math, science, and engineering, and his daughter studied biology. He enjoys many different hobbies, including playing the piano and the ukulele. Comiso has spoken admiringly of Filipino-born engineer Jose B. Cruz Jr. and cites physicist Richard Feynman as his personal hero of science.

== Honors and awards ==
- NASA Exceptional Scientific Achievement Medal (2013)
- Outstanding Book of the Year, National Academy of Science and Technology (2015)
- Corresponding Member, National Academy of Science and Technology (2020)
- Pamana ng Pilipino Award, Philippine Presidential Award for Filipino Individuals and Organizations Overseas (2021)
- Union Fellow of the American Geophysical Union (2025)

== Selected work ==
=== Papers ===
- Comiso, Josefino C.; Wadhams, Peter; Krabill, William B.; Swift, Robert N.; Crawford, James P.; Tucker III, William B. (1991). "Top/bottom multisensor remote sensing of Arctic sea ice". Journal of Geophysical Research. 96 (C2): 2693–2709. doi:10.1029/90JC02466.
- Comiso, Josefino C. (2002). "A rapidly declining perennial sea ice cover in the Arctic". Geophysical Research Letters. 29 (20): 17–1–17–4. doi:10.1029/2002GL015650.
- Comiso, Josefino C.; Parkinson, Claire L.; Gersten, Robert; Stock, Larry (2008). "Accelerated decline in the Arctic sea ice cover". Geophysical Research Letters. 35 (1): L01703. doi:10.1029/2007GL031972.
- Comiso, J. C.; Nishio, F. (2008). "Trends in the sea ice cover using enhanced and compatible AMSR-E, SSM/I, and SMMR data". Journal of Geophysical Research: Oceans. 113: C02S07. doi:10.1029/2007JC004257. hdl:2060/20070034825.
- Comiso, J. C.; Kwok, R.; Martin, S.; Gordon, A. L. (2011). "Variability and trends in sea ice extent and ice production in the Ross Sea". Journal of Geophysical Research: Oceans. 116: C04021. doi:10.1029/2010JC006391.
- Comiso, Josefino C. (2012). "Large decadal decline of the Arctic multiyear ice cover". Journal of Climate. 25 (4): 1176–1193. doi:10.1175/JCLI-D-11-00113.1.

=== Reports ===
- Zwally, H. J.; Comiso, J. C.; Parkinson, C. L.; Campbell, W. J.; Carsey, Frank D.; Gloersen, P. (1983). Antarctic Sea Ice, 1973–1976: Satellite Passive-Microwave Observations. NASA SP-459. National Aeronautics and Space Administration. OCLC 9620667.
- Parkinson, C. L.; Comiso, J. C.; Zwally, H. J.; Cavalieri, D. J.; Gloersen, P.; Campbell, W. J. (1987). Arctic Sea Ice, 1973–1976: Satellite Passive-Microwave Observations. NASA SP-489. OCLC 14586790.
- Gloersen, P.; Campbell, W. J.; Cavalieri, D. J.; Comiso, J. C.; Parkinson, C. L.; Zwally, H. J. (1992). Arctic and Antarctic Sea Ice, 1978–1987: Satellite Passive-Microwave Observations and Analysis. NASA SP-511. OCLC 27432806.
- Vaughan, D.G.; Comiso, J.C.; Allison, I.; Carrasco, J.; Kaser, G.; Kwok, R.; Mote, P.; Murray, T.; Paul, F.; Ren, J.; Rignot, E.; Solomina, O.; Steffen, K.; Zhang, T. (2013). "Chapter 4: Observations: Cryosphere" (PDF). In Stocker, T.F.; Qin, D.; Plattner, G.-K.; Tignor, M.; Allen, S.K.; Boschung, J.; Nauels, A.; Xia, Y.; Bex, V.; Midgley, P.M. (eds.). Climate Change 2013: The Physical Science Basis. Contribution of Working Group I to the Fifth Assessment Report of the Intergovernmental Panel on Climate Change. Cambridge University Press. pp. 317–382. ISBN 9781107415324. OCLC 881236891.

=== Books ===
- Comiso, Josefino C. (2010). Polar Oceans from Space. Springer. doi:10.1007/978-0-387-68300-3. ISBN 9780387366289. OCLC 663096366. Full access available to users of The Wikipedia Library.
- Comiso, Josefino C.; Baguinon, Nestor T. (2014). Changing Philippine Climate: Impacts on Agriculture and Natural Resources. University of the Philippines Press. ISBN 9789715427197. OCLC 885027088.
- Comiso, Josefino C., ed. (2024). Rediscovering Laguna de Bay: A Vital Natural Resource in Crisis. University of the Philippines Press. ISBN 9786210900323. OCLC 1442193453.

== Sources ==
=== Books ===
- Comiso, Josefino C. (2019) [2017]. "Climate Change and Sea Ice". In Richardson, Douglas; Castree, Noel; Goodchild, Michael F.; Kobayashi, Audrey; Liu, Weidong; Marston, Richard A. (eds.). International Encyclopedia of Geography. Wiley. doi:10.1002/9781118786352.wbieg0568.pub2. OCLC 978293909. Full access available to users of The Wikipedia Library.
- Johansen, Bruce E. (2024). "Weather and Global Warming". Climate Change: An Encyclopedia of Science, Society, and Solutions. Vol. 2 (1st ed.). ABC-CLIO. doi:10.5040/9798216961734. ISBN 9798216961734. OCLC 1457439134. Full access available to users of The Wikipedia Library.
- Lee-Chua, Queena N. (2000). "Space-Based Antarctic Explorer: Josefino Cacas Comiso". Ten Outstanding Filipino Scientists. Anvil Publishing. ISBN 9712710211. OCLC 606544491.
- Nadal, Kevin L.; Tintiangco-Cubales, Allyson; David, E. J. R. (2022). Nadal, Kevin Leo Yabut; Tintiangco-Cubales, Allyson; David, E. J. R. (eds.). The SAGE Encyclopedia of Filipina/x/o American Studies. SAGE Publications, Inc. ISBN 9781071828991. OCLC 1336703561.
- Vaughan, D. G.; Comiso, J. C.; Allison, I.; Carrasco, J. (2013). "Chapter 4: Observations: Cryosphere" (PDF). Climate Change 2013: The Physical Science Basis. Contribution of Working Group I to the Fifth Assessment Report of the Intergovernmental Panel on Climate Change. ISBN 9781107415324. OCLC 881236891.

=== Journals, papers, and reports ===
- Beitler, Jane (2020) [2008]. "Younger Sea Ice and Scarcer Polar Bears". Sensing Our Planet: NASA Earth Science Research Features (PDF) (Report). National Aeronautics and Space Administration. NASA Earth Observing System Data and Information System (EOSDIS) Data Centers. OCLC 404100501.
- Comiso, Josefino C. (1972). A measurement of π⁻ + proton → neutron + γ differential cross sections near the P₃₃(1232) resonance to test the ΔI ≤ 1 rule and time reversal invariance (PhD thesis). University of California, Los Angeles. OCLC 21101634.
- Comiso, Josefino C.; Meyer, T.; Schlepuetz, F.; Ziock, K. O. H. (July 7, 1975). "Measurement of the alpha-particle spectrum resulting from p⁻ capture in ¹²C". Physical Review Letters. 35: 13–21. doi:10.1103/PhysRevLett.35.13.
- Comiso, Josefino C.; Blasberg, D. J.; Haddock, R. P.; Nefkens, B. M. K.; Truoel, P.; Verhey, L. J. (1975). "Differential cross-section measurements of pion–nucleon interactions around the P33(1232) resonance". Physical Review D. 12: 738–743.
- Comiso, Josefino C. (1995). SSM/I Sea Ice Concentrations Using the Bootstrap Algorithm (Report). National Aeronautics and Space Administration. OCLC 34383334. 1380.
- Comiso, Josefino C. (2012). "Large Decadal Decline of the Arctic Multiyear Ice Cover". Journal of Climate. 25 (4): 1176–1193. doi:10.1175/JCLI-D-11-00113.1.
- Kerr, Richard A. (2008). "Climate Tipping Points Come In From the Cold". Science. 319 (5860). doi:10.1126/science.319.5860.153b. Full access available to users of The Wikipedia Library.
- Wadhams, P.; Comiso, J. C.; Prussen, E.; Wells, S.; Brandon, M.; Aldworth, E.; Viehoff, T.; Allegrino, R.; Crane, D. R. (1996). "The development of the Odden ice tongue in the Greenland Sea during winter 1993 from remote sensing and field observations". Journal of Geophysical Research: Oceans. 101 (8): 18213–18235.

=== Newspapers and magazines ===
- Gordon, Arnold L.; Comiso, Josefino C. (June 1988). "Polynyas in the Southern Ocean". Scientific American. 258 (6): 90–97.
- Hidlay, William C. (February 20, 1989). "Holes in Antarctic ice cap giving scientists keys to climatic mysteries". The Houston Chronicle. Associated Press.
- Manese-Lee, Angela (October 2004). "The Climate Detective". Filipinas. Vol. 13, no. 150. Black Box Investments LLC. p. 25.
- Revkin, Andrew C. (June 8, 2004). "An Icy Riddle as Big as Greenland". The New York Times.
- Revkin, Andrew C. (September 14, 2006). "NASA Scientists See New Signs of Global Warming". The New York Times.
- Sullivan, Walter S. (July 6, 1993). "A Vast Polar Ice Sheet Mysteriously Vanishes". The New York Times.

=== Websites ===
- Addressing the Climate and Environmental Crisis: A Special Webinar Celebrating Joey Comiso's 80th Birthday. University of the Philippines Diliman, Institute of Environmental Science and Meteorology, School of Environmental Science and Management, Philippine-American Academy of Science and Engineering, Philippine Engineers and Scientists Organization. September 21, 2020.
- California Marriage Index, 1960–1985, Josefino C Comiso. Center for Health Statistics, California Department of Health Services via Ancestry. June 27, 1970.
- Comiso, Josefino (November 5, 2013). "Jeep Accident, Sea Ice Anomalies and Global Climate Change". Maniac Talks. NASA Goddard Space Flight Center. Note: see auto-generated transcript.
- Evans, Jessica (August 12, 2015). "Josefino C. Comiso – Climate change, trends in sea ice and wintering in Antarctica". Conversations With Goddard. Goddard Space Flight Center.
- "Josefino C. Comiso". AGU Members. American Geophysical Union. "Josefino Comiso was a Senior Scientist at the Earth Sciences Division of the NASA/Goddard Space Flight Center (GSFC) until 2017 when he retired and became Emeritus Scientist."
- "Josefino C. Comiso". Sciences and Exploration Directorate 600. NASA. Archived from the original on November 10, 2023.
- "NAST Members: Comiso, Josefino C." National Academy of Science and Technology. 2016.
- "Scholars honor Filipino NASA scientist Comiso in webinar". University of the Philippines Los Baños. September 24, 2020.
- Zwally, H. Jay (May 14, 2019). "A Scientist: H. Jay Zwally". Maniac Talks. NASA Goddard Space Flight Center.
- "Dr. Josefino Comiso named 2025 AGU Union Fellow". Institute of Environmental Science & Meteorology. University of the Philippines, Diliman. October 24, 2025.
- "Celebrating Distinguished Overseas Filipino Individuals and Organizations in the 2021 PAFIOO". Presidential Awards for Filipino Individuals and Organizations Overseas.
