= Narvacan =

Municipality in Ilocos Sur, Philippines

- Municipality
- Municipality of Narvacan
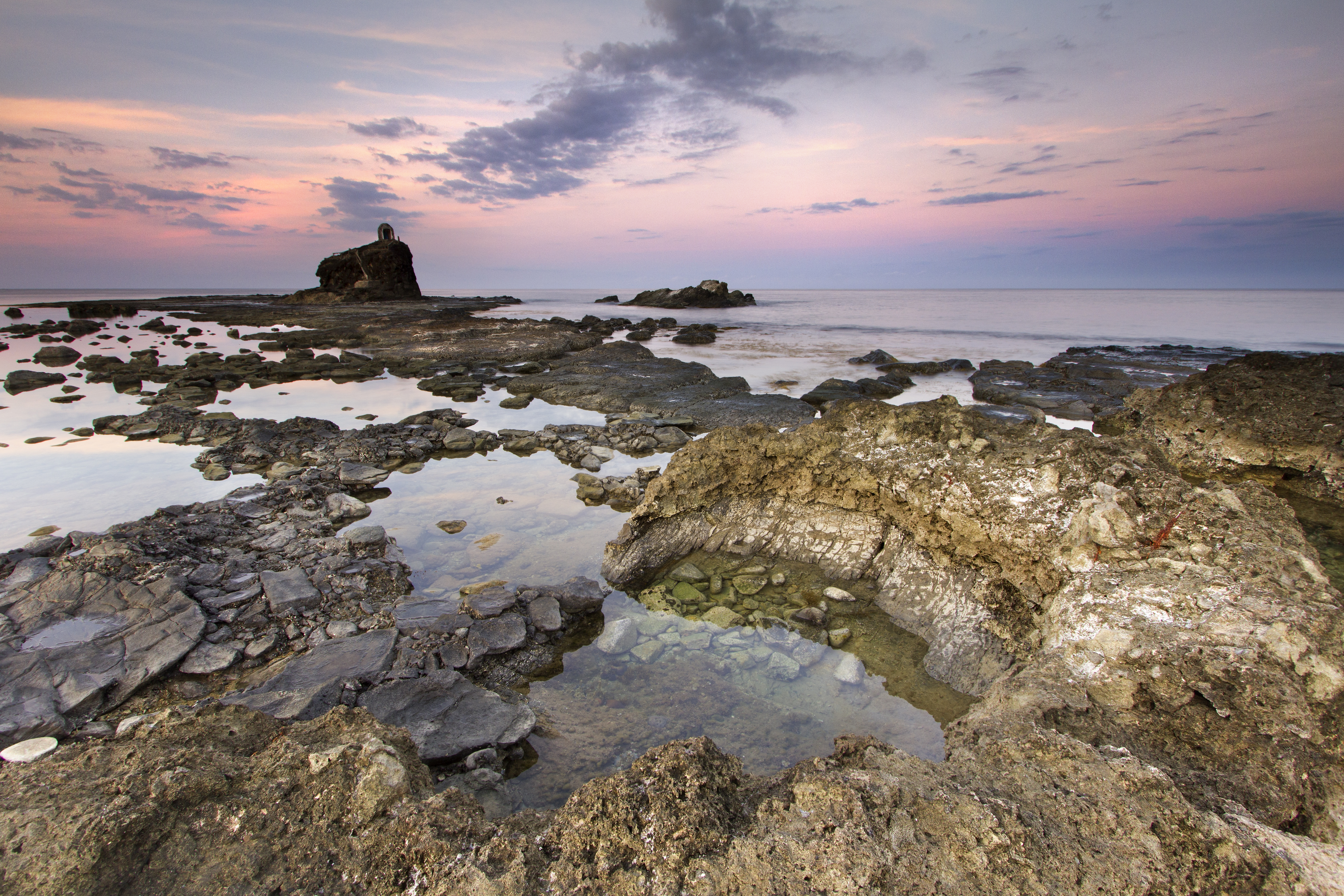
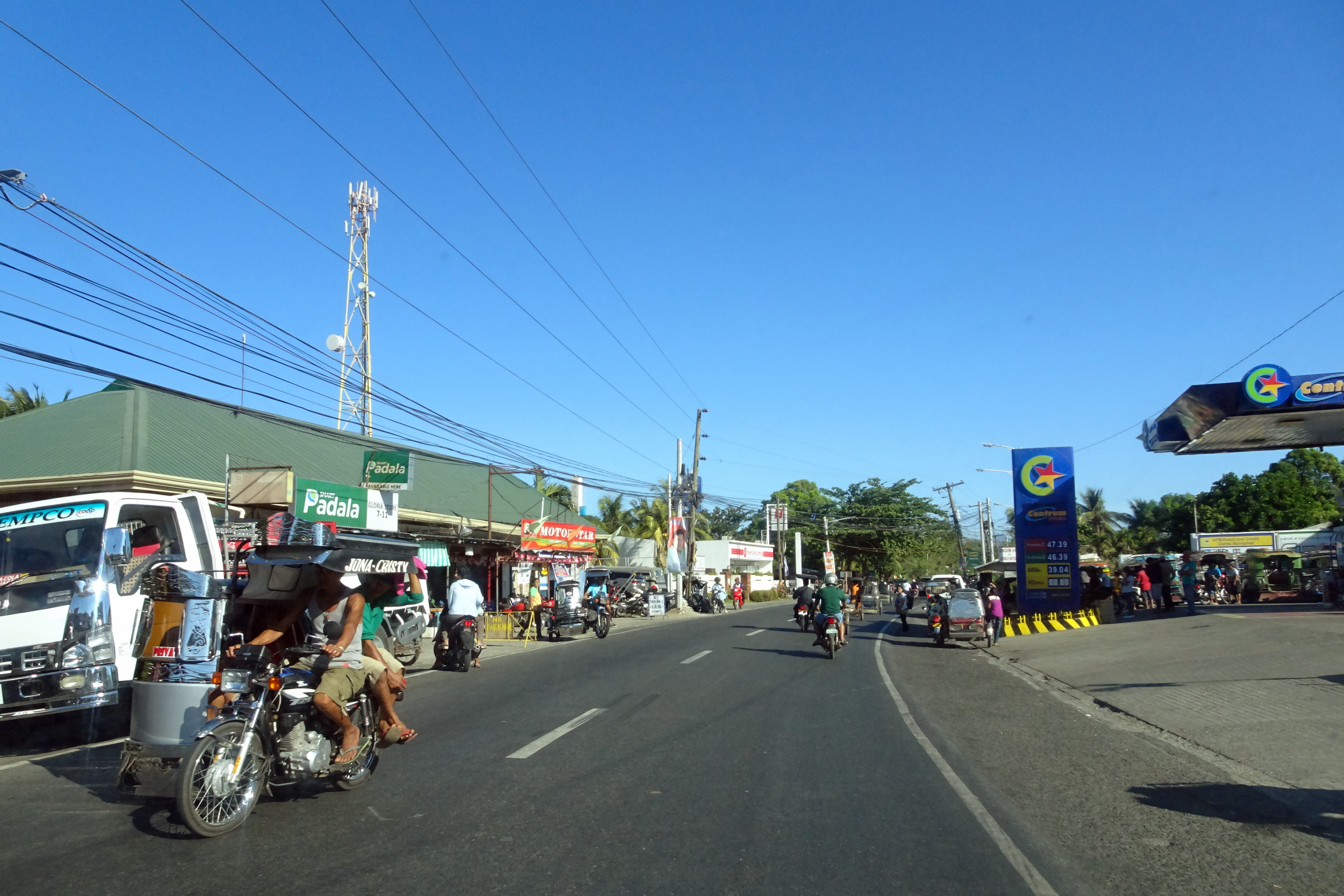
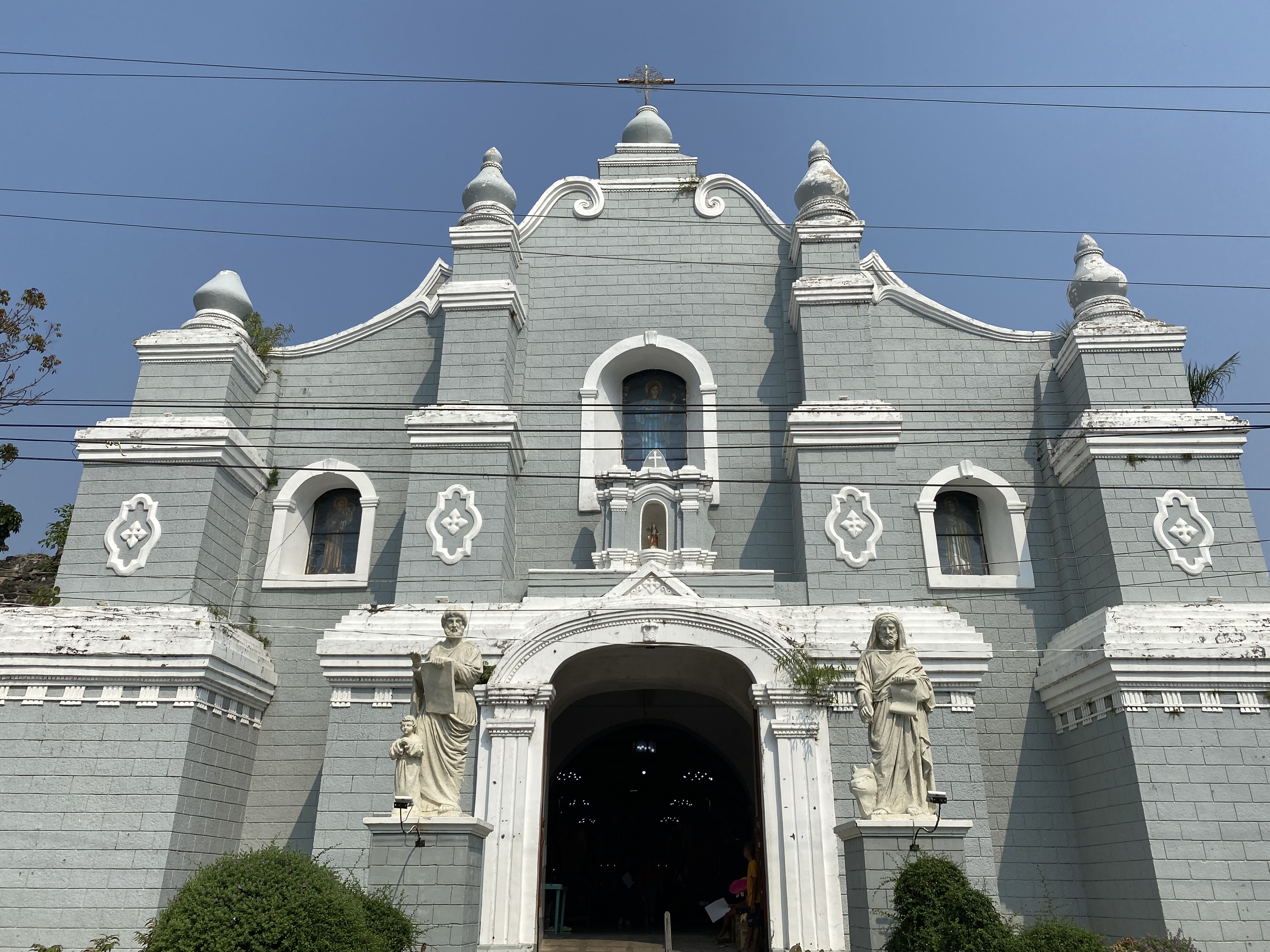
- Sulvec Point Town Proper Our Lady of Mt. Carmel Parish Church

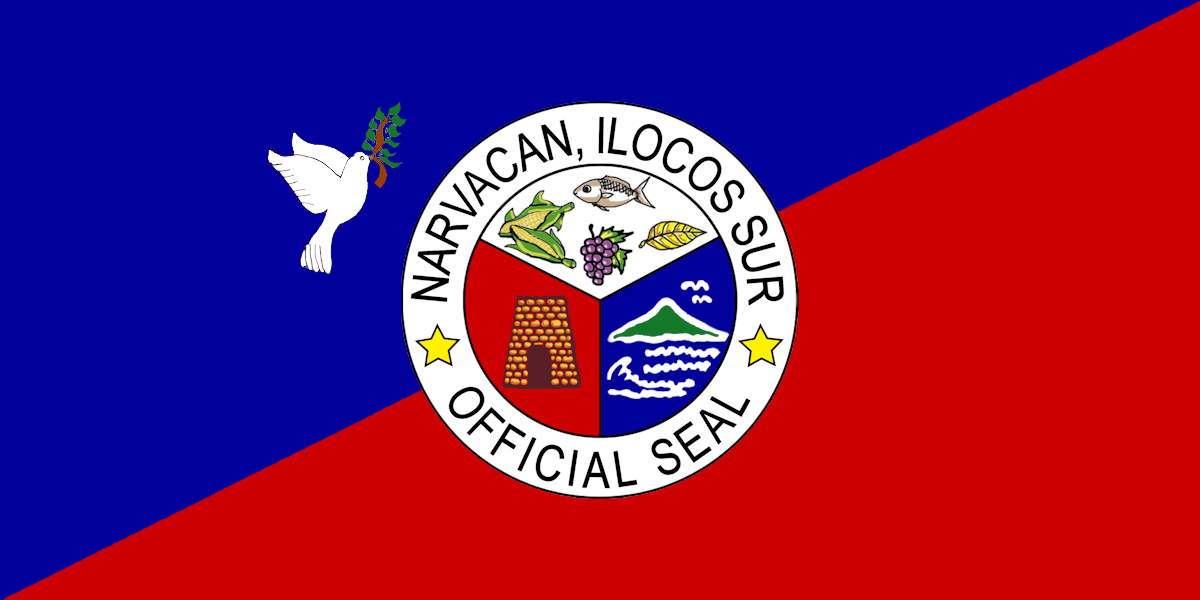
- Flag Seal
- Motto: Narvacan Naisangsangayan
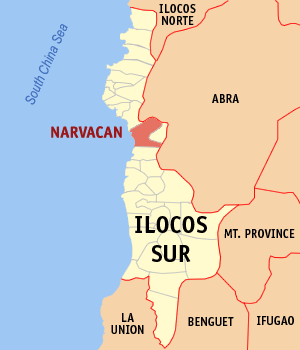
- Map of Ilocos Sur with Narvacan highlighted
- Interactive map of Narvacan
- Location within the Philippines
- Coordinates: 17°25′09″N 120°28′32″E
- Country: Philippines
- Region: Ilocos Region
- Province: Ilocos Sur
- District: 2nd district
- Barangays: 34 (see Barangays)

Government
  - Type: Sangguniang Bayan
  - Mayor: Edna C. Sanidad (Bileg)
  - Vice Mayor: Margarito A. Tejada (Bileg)
  - Representative: Kristine Singson-Meehan (NPC)
  - Municipal Council: Members: Denille Lou V. Valera; Luis Charles P. Singson; Mark Jun A. Tejada; Michael R. Velasco; Virginia C. Pe Benito; Teofilo M. Cabreros; Benjamin C. Dela Cuadra Jr.; Jose T. Corrales Jr.
  - Electorate: 31,745 voters (2025)

Area
  - Total: 122.21 km^{2} (47.19 sq mi)
- Elevation: 19 m (62 ft)
- Highest elevation: 359 m (1,178 ft)
- Lowest elevation: 0 m (0 ft)

Population (2024 census)
  - Total: 46,265
  - Density: 378.57/km^{2} (980.49/sq mi)
  - Households: 11,269

Economy
  - Income class: 1st municipal income class
  - Poverty incidence: 5.29% (2023)
  - Revenue: ₱ 4,473 million (2024)
  - Assets: ₱ 4,473 million (2024)
  - Expenditure: ₱ 1,293 million (2024)
  - Liabilities: ₱ 1,293 million (2024)

Service provider
  - Electricity: Ilocos Sur Electric Cooperative (ISECO)
- Time zone: UTC+8 (PST)
- ZIP code: 2704
- PSGC: 0102914000
- IDD : area code: +63 (0)77
- Native languages: Ilocano; Tagalog
- Website: www.narvacan.gov.ph

Narvacan, officially the Municipality of Narvacan (Ilocano: Ili ti Narvacan; Filipino: Bayan ng Narvacan), is a municipality in the province of Ilocos Sur, Philippines. According to the 2024 census, it has a population of 46,265 people.

== History ==
A Spanish expeditionary force sent from Vigan by the military officer and navigator, Captain Juan de Salcedo was shipwrecked along the town's coast in 1576. When they were being rescued by the natives, the Spaniards asked the natives what the name of their place was. The resident's leader replied in an Ilocano dialect by asking the Spaniards, "Nalbakan?" (Are you shipwrecked?). The Spaniards thought this to be the answer to their question, and from then, the place was referred to as Narvacan.

Salcedo befriended the small tribe of indigenous peoples in the valley that resided in the area while Spanish families established a township in 1576. As part of the modern township, a Roman Catholic parish was established by the Augustinian religious order on 25 April 1587. The Narvacan parish became one of the first Roman Catholic parishes in present-day Ilocos Sur. Once dedicated to Saint Lucy, it was rededicated in 2017 to the patronage of Our Lady of Mount Carmel, leaving Saint Lucy as its secondary patron.

The parish church boasts a facade of baroque architecture, with a bell tower situated on the right side of the church and a cemetery on the left. A school, the Narvacan Catholic School, is situated beside the bell tower of Narvacan.

Narvacan was organized under the traditions of the royal government of Spain. The Habsburg royal family served as the heads of state which in turn appointed Santiago de Vera as President of the Royal Audiencia – governor of the region in which Narvacan was situated. In 1589, Governor Vera appointed Nicolas de Figueroa as the first Encomendero de Narvacan – principal administrator of the town and its neighbors in the encomienda system. His role eventually evolved into the office of alcalde.

Through Presidential Proclamation No. 684, October 23, 2024 was declared a special non-working day to commemorate the Aldaw Ti Wayawaya-lli A Narvacan (Foundation Day of Narvacan).

== Geography ==
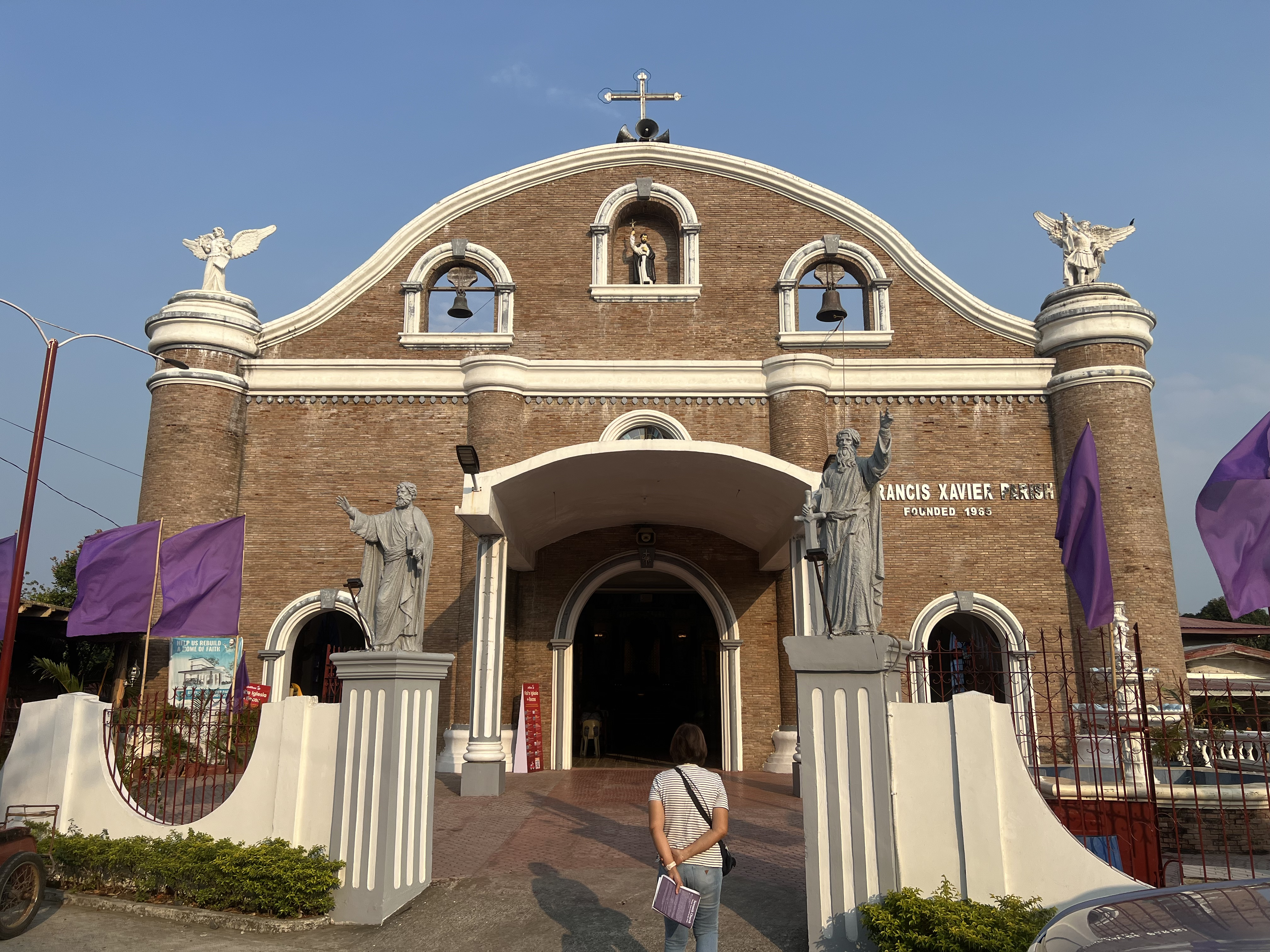
St. Francis Xavier Parish Church, Brgy. Lungog

The Municipality of Narvacan is bordered by the municipality of Santa to the north, San Quintin, Abra, Nagbukel and Pilar, Abra to the east, and Santa Maria to the south.

Narvacan is situated 31.45 kilometres (19.54 mi) from the provincial capital Vigan, and 372.95 kilometres (231.74 mi) from the country's capital city of Manila.

=== Barangays ===
Narvacan is politically subdivided into 34 barangays. Each barangay consists of puroks and some have sitios.

- Abuor
- Ambulogan
- Aquib
- Banglayan
- Bantay Abot
- Bulanos
- Cadacad
- Cagayungan
- Camarao
- Casilagan
- Codoog
- Dasay
- Dinalaoan
- Estancia
- Lanipao
- Lungog
- Margaay
- Marozo
- Nanguneg
- Orence
- Pantoc
- Paratong
- Parparia
- Quinarayan
- Rivadavia
- San Antonio
- San Jose (Poblacion)
- San Pablo
- San Pedro
- Santa Lucia (Poblacion)
- Sarmingan
- Sucoc
- Sulvec
- Turod

=== Climate ===
Climate data for Narvacan, Ilocos Sur
Month	Jan	Feb	Mar	Apr	May	Jun	Jul	Aug	Sep	Oct	Nov	Dec	Year
Mean daily maximum °C (°F)	30 (86)	31 (88)	33 (91)	34 (93)	33 (91)	31 (88)	30 (86)	30 (86)	30 (86)	31 (88)	31 (88)	30 (86)	31 (88)
Mean daily minimum °C (°F)	19 (66)	20 (68)	21 (70)	23 (73)	25 (77)	25 (77)	25 (77)	25 (77)	24 (75)	22 (72)	21 (70)	20 (68)	23 (73)
Average precipitation mm (inches)	10 (0.4)	10 (0.4)	14 (0.6)	23 (0.9)	80 (3.1)	103 (4.1)	121 (4.8)	111 (4.4)	119 (4.7)	144 (5.7)	39 (1.5)	15 (0.6)	789 (31.2)
Average rainy days	5.2	3.9	6.2	9.1	18.5	21.4	22.9	19.8	19.8	16.2	10.5	6.1	159.6
Source: Meteoblue (modeled/calculated data, not measured locally)

== Demographics ==
Population census of Narvacan

Year	Pop.	±% p.a.
1903	19,575	—
1918	23,071	+1.10%
1939	22,769	−0.06%
1948	22,237	−0.26%
1960	26,872	+1.59%
1970	26,962	+0.03%

Year	Pop.	±% p.a.
1975	28,516	+1.13%
1980	30,682	+1.47%
1990	35,153	+1.37%
1995	35,489	+0.18%
2000	38,435	+1.72%
2007	41,578	+1.09%

Year	Pop.	±% p.a.
2010	42,803	+1.06%
2015	44,006	+0.53%
2020	46,234	+1.04%
2024	46,265	+0.02%

Source: Philippine Statistics Authority

In the 2024 census, Narvacan had a population of 46,265 people. The population density was 380 inhabitants per square kilometre (980/sq mi).

=== Language ===
The primary language spoken in Narvacan is Ilocano.

== Economy ==
Poverty incidence of Narvacan (%)

Source: Philippine Statistics Authority

The main economic source of Narvacan is agriculture. Farmers produce rice, corn, cotton, and tobacco. Narvacan has established commercial spaces like the Narvacan Farmers Market.

== Government ==
=== Local government ===
Narvacan, belonging to the second congressional district of the province of Ilocos Sur, is governed by a mayor designated as its local chief executive and by a municipal council as its legislative body in accordance with the Local Government Code. The mayor, vice mayor, and the councilors are elected directly by the people through an election which is being held every three years.

=== Elected officials ===
Members of the Municipal Council (2025–2028)
Position	Name
Congressman	Kristine Singson-Meehan
Mayor	Edna C. Sanidad
Vice-Mayor	Margarito A. Tejada
Councilors	Denille Lou V. Valera
Councilors	Luis Charles P. Singson
Councilors	Mark Jun A. Tejada
Councilors	Michael R. Velasco
Councilors	Virginia C. Pe Benito
Councilors	Teofilo M. Cabreros
Councilors	Benjamin C. Dela Cuadra Jr.
Councilors	Jose T. Corrales Jr.

== Education ==
There are two schools district offices which govern the educational institutions within the municipality. These are Narvacan North Schools District Office, and Narvacan South Schools District Office. They oversee the operations of private and public elementary and high schools. Both schools district offices (SDOs) also govern the operations of educational institutions in the municipality of Nagbukel.

=== Primary and elementary schools ===
- Ambulogan Elementary School
- Anteng Primary School
- Aquib Elementary School
- Banglayan Elementary School
- Bulanos Elementary School
- Cadacad Elementary School
- Cagayungan Elementary School
- Camarao Elementary School
- Casilagan Elementary School
- Codoog Elementary School
- Dasay Elementary School
- Dinalaoan Primary School
- Kakaldingan Elementary School
- Lanipao Elementary School
- Little Angel Learning Center
- Marozo Elementary School
- Nanguneg East Elementary School
- Narvacan South Central School SPED Center
- Nanguneg West Primary School
- Narvacan North Central School
- Orence Elementary School
- Parparia Elementary School
- Pantoc Elementary School
- Paratong Elementary School
- Quinarayan Elementary School
- Rivadavia Elementary School
- San Antonio Elementary School
- San Pablo Elementary School
- San Pedro Elementary School
- Sarmingan Elementary School
- Sergeant Reynalie Elementary School
- St. Gregory Elementary School
- Sucoc Elementary School
- Turod Elementary School

=== Secondary schools ===
- Imelda National High School
- Lungog Integrated School
- Narvacan Catholic School
- Narvacan National Central High School
- San Pedro National High School
- Sulvec Integrated School

=== Higher educational institutions ===
The Narvacan School of Fisheries, a branch of the Ilocos Sur Polytechnic State College (ISPSC), has been located in Sulvec since 1964. It is also the base of operations of the Philippine Army's 503rd Infantry Brigade, which oversees the Citizen Armed Forces Geographical Units.

== Notable people ==
- Josefino Comiso (born 1940), American climatologist
- Raul Villanueva (born 1963), 195th Associate Justice of the Supreme Court of the Philippines
