= Attribution (psychology) =

Process by which individuals explain causes of behavior and events

Attribution is a term used in psychology which deals with how individuals perceive the causes of everyday experience, as being either external or internal. Models to explain this process are called Attribution theory. Psychological research into attribution began with the work of Fritz Heider in the early 20th century, and the theory was further advanced by Harold Kelley and Bernard Weiner. Heider first introduced the concept of perceived 'locus of causality' to define the perception of one's environment.

For instance, an experience may be perceived as being caused by factors outside the person's control (external) or it may be perceived as the person's own doing (internal). These initial perceptions are called attributions. Psychologists use these attributions to better understand an individual's motivation and competence. The theory is of particular interest to employers who use it to increase worker motivation, goal orientation, and productivity.

Psychologists have identified various biases in the way people attribute causation, especially when dealing with others. The fundamental attribution error describes the tendency to attribute dispositional or personality-based explanations for behavior, rather than considering external factors. In other words, a person tends to assume that other people are each responsible for their own misfortunes, while blaming external factors for the person's own misfortunes. Culture bias is when someone makes an assumption about the behavior of a person based on their own cultural practices and beliefs.

Attribution theory has been criticised as being mechanistic and reductionist for assuming that people are rational, logical, and systematic thinkers. It also fails to address the social, cultural, and historical factors that shape attributions of cause.

== Background ==
Fritz Heider originated Attribution theory during a time when psychologists were furthering research on personality, social psychology, and human motivation. Heider worked alone in his research, but stated that he wished for Attribution theory not to be attributed to him because many different ideas and people were involved in the process. Weiner argued that Heider was too modest, and the openness of the theory keeps its presence functional today. Attribution theory is the original parent theory with Harold Kelley's covariation model and Bernard Weiner's three-dimensional model branching from Attribution theory. Attribution theory also influenced several other theories as well such as Heider's Perceived Locus of Causality which eventually led to Deci and Ryan's Theory of Self-determination.

== Key theorists ==
=== Fritz Heider ===
Gestalt psychologist Fritz Heider is often described as the early-20th-century "father of Attribution theory". In his 1920 dissertation, Heider addressed the problem of phenomenology: why do perceivers attribute the properties such as color to perceived objects, when those properties are mental constructs? Heider's answer that perceivers attribute that which they "directly" sense – vibrations in the air for instance – to an object they construe as causing those to sense data. "Perceivers faced with sensory data thus see the perceptual object as 'out there', because they attribute the sensory data to their underlying causes in the world." Heider extended this idea to attributions about people: "motives, intentions, sentiments ... the core processes which manifest themselves in overt behavior". Fritz Heider's most famous contribution to psychology started in the 1940s when he began studying and accumulating knowledge on interpersonal behavior and social perception. He compiled these findings into his 1958 book "The Psychology of Interpersonal Relations," and Heider's work became widely recognized as the best source of knowledge on Attribution theory. In this book, Heider outlines two key goals that he planned to achieve in his studies. His first goal was to develop a scientific theory that was based on a "conceptual network suitable to some of the problems in this field." Theorists that attempt to follow in Heider's footsteps widely misinterpret this goal, as many falsely assume that the core of human behavior is person-dichotomy rather than what Heider actually suggested in his book. Heider's second goal was to redefine the understanding of "common-sense psychology" in order to develop his own scientific theory that explains social perception in humans. This second goal more clearly defined Heider's theory on attribution. Through Heider's research of Attribution Theory, he concerned himself with the reasons a person achieved success or failed. To organize the research, Heider broke the reasonings down into three different subjects, the first being ability, second being effort, and third being task difficulty. Heider saw both ability and effort being internal factors and task difficulty being an external factor.

=== Bernard Weiner ===
Bernard Weiner was not the theory's originator; however, he expanded on Attribution theory in several ways to help keep it relevant to today's society. The most influential aspect of Weiner's work consists of the motivational aspect of Attribution theory, which he introduced around the year 1968. This means that how one perceives past events and actions determines what actions a person will take in their future because the past experiences motivated them to do so. Weiner built his contribution of Attribution theory off of other well-known theories such as Atkinsons' Theory of Motivation, Drive theory, and Thorndike's Law of Effect which describes how rewarded behaviors will more than likely be repeated. Weiner argued that Attribution theory is subjective meaning a person's thoughts and feelings drive this theory. This means that researchers do not have to remain objective in their research and can explore the emotions, biases, motivations, and behaviors of their participants.

=== Harold Kelley ===
Harold Kelley, a social psychologist, expanded upon Heider's Attribution theory. Kelley's main research goal was to emphasize the central ideas Heider discovered in Attribution theory. The first focus of Kelley's research was a look at external and internal attributions. His second focus was determining whether the procedure to arrive at external and internal attributes was related to experimental methodology. Kelley later turned this idea into his covariation model/principle. Kelley describes this principle as "the effect that is attributed to that condition which is present when the effect is present and which is absent when the effect is absent". Kelley looked at causal inferences and attempted to elaborate on Heider's model by explaining the effects of certain factors.

== Types ==
=== External ===
External attribution, also called situational attribution, refers to interpreting someone's behavior as being caused by the individual's environment. For example, if one's car tire is punctured, it may be attributed to a hole in the road; by making attributions to the poor condition of the highway, one can make sense of the event without any discomfort that it may in reality have been the result of their own bad driving. Individuals are more likely to associate unfortunate events with external factors than with internal factors.

For example, consider someone who uses external attributions as a way not to use hearing aids. Examples of this are: A patient does not have the money to afford hearing aids, so they do not purchase them. A person believes using hearing aids would make them a burden to people they are around, so they do not wear them. A person does not trust the doctor that is prescribing them hearing aids. Lastly, a person believes that other health conditions, either about themselves or someone else in their life, take priority over their need for hearing aids.

Fangfang Wen examined how people react when viewing situations from an external perspective, focusing on how an attribution of blame affects emotions and behavior. The study tested whether individuals who assign blame to people rather than external factors are more likely to experience anger, which can then lead to aggressive behavior or social avoidance. To investigate this, the researchers analyzed reactions to two real-life events: a private data leak involving Wuhan returnees and the refusal of workers returning from Hubei. In the third part of the study, they explained whether changing how people would recognize the blame (internal versus external) would influence their emotions and upcoming actions. The findings show that when individuals attribute blame to others (an internal attribution), they are more likely to feel anger and disrespect, resulting in either aggression or avoidance. The study shows how internal attributions can intensify negative emotional responses and shape social behaviors.

=== Internal ===
Internal attribution, or dispositional attribution, refers to the process of assigning the cause of behavior to some internal characteristic, likeability and motivation, rather than to outside forces. This concept has overlap with the locus of control, in which individuals feel they are personally responsible for everything that happens to them.

Consider the example of a person who uses internal attributions to justify not wearing their prescribed hearing aids. Examples of this are: A patient believes the hearing aids not to be necessary, so they choose not to wear them. A patient fears being stigmatized for having a disability and requiring hearing aids to hear correctly, so they decide not to wear them. A patient is struggling with adding hearing aids into their everyday life and believes it to be easier not to wear them. Lastly, a patient does not fully understand the benefits that hearing aids will give them, so they choose not to wear them despite the benefits hearing aids would grant them.

Fangfang Wen explained how third-party observers reacted to discrimination against returning workers from Hubei, focusing on how their ability to assign blame (internal attribution) influenced their emotions and behaviors. The study found that when observers are blamed, they feel angrier, leading to either avoidance or aggressive behavior. Other emotions, such as sadness and tension, remained the same. This finding supports the cognition-emotion-action model, which shows how individuals interpretations of a situation influence their emotional responses and following actions. In contrast to external attribution, where the environmental factors are to blame, internal attribution leads to stronger negative emotions and more intense reactions.

== Other dimensions of attribution ==
The distinction between internal and external attributions was supplemented by other dimensions of attribution once attribution theory was applied to understanding clinical depression. These are whether a cause is perceived as being stable or unstable, i.e. whether it lasts over time or is short-term, and whether a cause is perceived as being global (i.e. affecting all situations in a person's life) or situation-specific.

== Theories and models ==
=== Common sense psychology ===
From the book The Psychology of Interpersonal Relations (1958), Fritz Heider tried to explore the nature of interpersonal relationship, and espoused the concept of what he called "common sense" or "naïve psychology". In his theory, he believed that people observe, analyze, and explain behaviors with explanations. Although people have different kinds of explanations for the events of human behaviors, Heider found it is very useful to group explanation into two categories; Internal (personal) and external (situational) attributions. When an internal attribution is made, the cause of the given behavior is assigned to the individual's characteristics such as ability, personality, mood, efforts, attitudes, or disposition. When an external attribution is made, the cause of the given behavior is assigned to the situation in which the behavior was seen such as the task, other people, or luck (that the individual producing the behavior did so because of the surrounding environment or the social situation). These two types lead to very different perceptions of the individual engaging in a behavior.

=== Perceived locus of causality ===
Heider first introduced the concept of perceived locus of causality using it to define interpersonal perception of one's environment. This theory explains how individuals perceive the causality of different events whether being external or internally based. These initial perceptions are called attributions. These attributions are viewed on a continuum of external to internal motivation. Understanding an individual's perception of causality also opens doors to a better understanding of how to better motivate an individual in specific tasks by increasing levels of autonomy, relatedness, and competence. The theory of perceived locus of causality lead to Deci and Ryan's theory of self-determination. Self-determination theory uses perceived locus of causality to measure feelings of autonomy from behaviors performed by the individual. For this reason perceived locus of causality has caught the eye of employers and psychologists to help determine how to increase an individual's motivation and goal orientation to increase effectiveness within their respective fields. Research has shown that spectators at an athletic event often attribute their team's victory to internal causes and their team's losses to external causes. This is an example of self-serving attribution error or fundamental attribution error and is more common than one might think.

=== Correspondent inference ===
Correspondent inferences state that people make inferences about a person when their actions are freely chosen, are unexpected, and result in a small number of desirable effects. According to Edward E. Jones and Keith Davis' correspondent inference theory, people make correspondent inferences by reviewing the context of behavior. It describes how people try to find out an individual's personal characteristics from the behavioral evidence. People make inferences on the basis of three factors; degree of choice, expectedness of behavior, and effects of someone's behaviors. For example, we believe we can make stronger assumptions about a man who gives half of his money to charity, than we can about one who gives $5 to charity. An average person would not want to donate as much as the first man because they would lose a lot of money. By donating half of his money, it is easier for someone to figure out what the first man's personality is like. The second factor, that affects correspondence of action and inferred characteristic, is the number of differences between the choices made and the previous alternatives. If there are not many differences, the assumption made will match the action because it is easy to guess the important aspect between each choice.

=== Covariation model ===
The covariation model states that people attribute behavior to the factors that are present when a behavior occurs and absent when it does not. Thus, the theory assumes that people make causal attributions in a rational, logical fashion, and that they assign the cause of an action to the factor that co-varies most closely with that action. Harold Kelley's covariation model of attribution looks to three main types of information from which to make an attribution decision about an individual's behavior. The first is consensus information, or information on how other people in the same situation and with the same stimulus behave. The second is distinctive information, or how the individual responds to different stimuli. The third is consistency information, or how frequent the individual's behavior can be observed with similar stimulus but varied situations. From these three sources of affirmation observers make attribution decisions on the individual's behavior as either internal or external. There have been claims that people under-utilise consensus information, although there has been some dispute over this.

There are several levels in the covariation model: high and low. Each of these levels influences the three covariation model criteria. High consensus is when many people can agree on an event or area of interest. Low consensus is when very few people can agree. High distinctiveness is when the event or area of interest is very unusual, whereas low distinctness is when the event or area of interest is fairly common. High consistency is when the event or area of interest continues for a length of time and low consistency is when the event or area of interest goes away quickly.

=== Three-dimensional model ===
Bernard Weiner proposed that individuals have initial affective responses to the potential consequences of the intrinsic or extrinsic motives of the actor, which in turn influence future behavior. That is, a person's own perceptions or attributions as to why they succeeded or failed at an activity determine the amount of effort the person will engage in activities in the future. Weiner suggests that individuals exert their attribution search and cognitively evaluate casual properties on the behaviors they experience. When attributions lead to positive affect and high expectancy of future success, such attributions should result in greater willingness to approach to similar achievement tasks in the future than those attributions that produce negative affect and low expectancy of future success. Eventually, such affective and cognitive assessment influences future behavior when individuals encounter similar situations.

Weiner's achievement attribution has three categories:

1. stability (stable and unstable)
2. locus of causality (internal and external)
3. controllability (controllable or uncontrollable)

Stability influences individuals' expectancy about their future; control is related with individuals' persistence on mission; causality influences emotional responses to the outcome of task.

== Bias and errors ==
While people strive to find reasons for behaviors, they fall into many traps of biases and errors. As Fritz Heider says, "our perceptions of causality are often distorted by our needs and certain cognitive biases". The following are examples of attributional biases.

=== Fundamental attribution error ===
The fundamental attribution error describes the habit to misunderstand dispositional or personality-based explanations for behavior, rather than considering external factors. The fundamental attribution error is most visible when people explain and assume the behavior of others. For example, if a person is overweight, a person's first assumption might be that they have a problem with overeating or are lazy, and not that they might have a medical reason for being heavier set.

When evaluating others' behaviors, the situational context is often ignored in favor of assuming the disposition of the actor to be the cause of an observed behavior. This is because, when a behavior occurs, attention is most often focused on the person performing the behavior. Thus the individual is more salient than the environment, and dispositional attributions are made more often than situational attributions to explain the behavior of others.

However, when evaluating one's own behavior, the situational factors are often exaggerated when there is a negative outcome, while dispositional factors are exaggerated when there is a positive outcome.

The core process assumptions of attitude construction models are mainstays of social cognition research and are not controversial—as long as we talk about "judgment". Once the particular judgment made can be thought of as a person's "attitude", however, construal assumptions elicit discomfort, presumably because they dispense with the intuitively appealing attitude concept.

Sociocultural disparities are a main source for the propensity of the fundamental attribution error caused by an augment of inferring dispositional attribution while ignoring situational attribution.

=== Culture bias ===
Culture bias is when someone makes an assumption about the behavior of a person based on their own cultural practices and beliefs. An example of culture bias is the dichotomy of "individualistic" and "collectivistic cultures". People in individualist cultures, generally Anglo-America and Anglo-Saxon European, are characterized as societies which value individualism, personal goals, and independence. People in collectivist cultures are thought to regard individuals as members of groups such as families, tribes, work units, and nations, and tend to value conformity and interdependence. In other words, working together and being involved as a group is more common in certain cultures that view each person as a part of the community. This cultural trait is common in Asia, traditional Native American societies, and Africa. Research shows that culture, either individualist or collectivist, affects how people make attributions.

People from individualist cultures are more inclined to make fundamental-attribution error than people from collectivist cultures. Individualist cultures tend to attribute a person's behavior due to their internal factors whereas collectivist cultures tend to attribute a person's behavior to his external factors.

Research suggests that individualist cultures engage in self-serving bias more than do collectivist cultures, i.e. individualist cultures tend to attribute success to internal factors and to attribute failure to external factors. In contrast, collectivist cultures engage in the opposite of self-serving bias i.e. self-effacing bias, which is: attributing success to external factors and blaming failure on internal factors (the individual).

Further research suggests that in the United States in particular, culture bias implies a hyperbolized function of culture within the social environments dominated by minorities. These research findings are further supported by aggravation of the perception that there is less of a role in the presence of psychological development of minorities as opposed to their Caucasian counterparts.

=== Actor/observer difference ===
People tend to attribute other people's behaviors to their dispositional factors while attributing their own actions to situational factors. In the same situation, people's attribution can differ depending on their role as actor or observer. Actors express their behavior differently from an observer. For example, when a person scores a low grade on a test, they find situational factors to justify the negative event such as saying that the teacher asked a question that he/she never went over in class. However, if another person scores poorly on a test, the person will attribute the results to internal factors such as laziness and inattentiveness in classes. The theory of the actor-observer bias was first developed by E. Jones and R. Nisbett in 1971, whose explanation for the effect was that when we observe other people, we tend to focus on the person, whereas when we are actors, our attention is focused towards situational factors. The actor/observer bias is used less frequently with people one knows well such as friends and family since one knows how his/her close friends and family will behave in certain situation, leading him/her to think more about the external factors rather than internal factors.

=== Dispositional attributions ===
Dispositional attribution is a tendency to attribute people's behaviors to their dispositions; that is, to their personality, character, and ability.

For example, when a normally pleasant waiter is being rude to his/her customer, the customer may assume he/she has a bad character. The customer, looking at the attitude that the waiter is giving him/her, instantly decides that the waiter is a bad person. The customer oversimplifies the situation by not taking into account all the unfortunate events that might have happened to the waiter which made him/her become rude at that moment. Therefore, the customer made dispositional attribution by attributing the waiter's behavior directly to his/her personality rather than considering situational factors that might have caused the whole "rudeness".

The degree of dispositional attribution varies greatly within people. As seen within culture bias, dispositional attribution is impacted by personal beliefs and individual perspectives. Research has shown that dispositional attribution can be influenced by explicit inferences (i.e. instructions or information provided to an individual) that can essentially "guide" a person's judgement.

=== Self-serving bias ===
Self-serving bias is attributing dispositional and internal factors for success, while external and uncontrollable factors are used to explain the reason for failure. For example, if a person gets promoted, it is because of his/her ability and competence whereas if he/she does not get promoted, it is because his/her manager does not like him/her (external, uncontrollable factor). Originally, researchers assumed that self-serving bias is strongly related to the fact that people want to protect their self-esteem. However, an alternative information processing explanation is that when the outcomes match people's expectations, they make attributions to internal factors; for example, someone who passes a test might believe it was because of their intelligence. Whereas when the outcome does not match their expectations, they make external attributions or excuses; the same person might excuse failing a test by saying that they did not have enough time to study. People also use defensive attribution to avoid feelings of vulnerability and to differentiate themselves from a victim of a tragic accident. An alternative version of the theory of self-serving bias states that the bias does not arise because people wish to protect their private self-esteem, but to protect their self-image (a self-presentational bias). This version of the theory, which is in line with social desirability bias, would predict that people attribute their successes to situational factors, for fear that others will disapprove of them looking overly vain if they should attribute successes to themselves.

For example, there is a hypothesis that coming to believe that "good things happen to good people and bad things happen to bad people" will reduce feelings of vulnerability. However, this just-world bias has a critical drawback, which is having a tendency to blame victims, even in tragic situations. When a mudslide destroys several houses in a rural neighborhood, a person living in a more urban setting might blame the victims for choosing to live in a certain area or not building a safer, stronger house. Another example of attributional bias is optimism bias in which most people believe positive events happen to them more often than to others and that negative events happen to them less often than to others. For example, smokers on average believe they are less likely to get lung cancer than other smokers.

=== Defensive attribution hypothesis ===
The defensive attribution hypothesis is a social psychological term referring to a set of beliefs held by an individual with the function of defending themselves from concern that they will be the cause or victim of a mishap. Commonly, defensive attributions are made when individuals witness or learn of a mishap happening to another person. In these situations, attributions of responsibility to the victim or harm-doer for the mishap will depend upon the severity of the outcomes of the mishap and the level of personal and situational similarity between the individual and victim. More responsibility will be attributed to the harm-doer as the outcome becomes more severe, and as personal or situational similarity decreases.

An example of defensive attribution is the just-world fallacy, which is where "good things happen to good people and bad things happen to bad people". People believe in this in order to avoid feeling vulnerable to situations that they have no control over. However, this also leads to blaming the victim even in a tragic situation. When people hear someone died from a car accident, they decide that the driver was drunk at the time of the accident, and so they reassure themselves that an accident will never happen to them. Despite the fact there was no other information provided, people will automatically attribute that the accident was the driver's fault due to an internal factor (in this case, deciding to drive while drunk), and thus they would not allow it to happen to themselves.

Another example of defensive attribution is optimism bias, in which people believe positive events happen to them more often than to others and that negative events happen to them less often than to others. Too much optimism leads people to ignore some warnings and precautions given to them. For example, smokers believe that they are less likely to get lung cancer than other smokers.

=== Cognitive dissonance theory ===
Cognitive dissonance theory refers to a situation involving conflicting attitudes, beliefs or behaviors that cause arousal within the individual. The arousal often produces a feeling of mental or even physical discomfort either leading the individual to alter their own attitudes, beliefs, or behaviors or attributions of the situation. It is much harder for a person to change their behaviors or beliefs than it is to change how they perceive a situation. For example, if someone perceives themselves as being very capable in a sport but perform poorly during a game, they are more likely to attribute or blame the poor performance on an external factor than on internal factors such as their skill and ability. This is done in an effort to preserve their current held beliefs and perceptions about themselves; otherwise, they are left to face the thought that they are not as good at the sport as they originally thought, causing a feeling of dissonance and arousal.

== Application ==
=== In court and law ===
Attribution theory can be applied to juror decision making. Jurors use attributions to explain the cause of the defendant's intent and actions related to the criminal behavior. The attribution made (situational or dispositional) might affect a juror's punitiveness towards the defendant. When jurors attribute a defendant's behavior to dispositional attributions they tend to be more punitive and are more likely find a defendant guilty and to recommend a death sentence compared to a life sentence.

Black youth are 1.4x more likely to be given secure confinement, the most severe sanction for a juvenile, when compared to white youth. A study done by Patrick Lowery and John Burrow found that many judicial actors subconsciously attempt to justify simplifications of complex cases by using societal "norms and values" that "include evaluations of stability, consistency, or volatility." Other factors for juveniles include the state of their homes and the state of their communities. Juveniles that come from single-parent homes are more likely to be prosecuted and charged with crimes; this information is known to jurors or judges and could add bias into a decision made by them. The same study brought socio-economic status into question as potential bias. Arrest rates have been shown to be higher in poorer areas when compared to areas of greater wealth.

=== In marketing communication ===
The Attribution theories have been used as a tool to analyze causal attributions made by consumers and its effectiveness in marketing communication. Attribution theory has also been utilized to examine external and internal factors of corporate social responsibility (CSR), and the affects the different social movements corporations endorsed have on consumers and their emotions. Companies have moved to illustrate their different CSR efforts in their marketing and advertisements. However, people are beginning to question the companies real motivations and involvement in the different social movements that certain companies market. This concern arises due to the practice of CSR-washing, which is when the company promotes itself that it is more involved in a specific movement than the company claims to be. Attributions for companies that perform CSR activities may be external such as environmental or situational factors. Companies can have internal factors like a CEO's personal values. Studies find that companies that market CSR communications, whether they practice CSR-washing or not, are seen to be more motivated to make a difference outside of their organization than companies that remain discreet about their CSR involvement. When customers began to become suspicious of a company, then that company tended to become more involved in their CSR communications and attributed their behavior to the company's commitment to the movement.

=== In clinical psychology ===
Attribution theory has had a big application in clinical psychology. Abramson, Seligman, and Teasdale developed a theory of the depressive attributional style, claiming that individuals who tend to attribute their failures to internal, stable and global factors are more vulnerable to clinical depression. This style is correlated with self-reported rates of depression, as well as posttraumatic stress disorder, anxiety, and higher risks of developing depression. The Depressive attributional style is defined by high levels of pessimism, rumination, hopelessness, self-criticism, poorer academic performance, and a tendency to believe negative outcomes and events are one's own fault. People with this attributional style may place high levels of importance on their own reputation and social status. They may be sensitive to rejection by peers and may often interpret actions as more hostile than they really are. This explanatory style may be caused by depressive symptoms in the patient's parents.

Some research has suggested that this attributional style might not result in increased levels of depression amongst certain cultures. A study conducted by researchers at Tsinghua University found that this style was common amongst Buddhists due to cultural beliefs in ideas such as Karma yet they did not demonstrate increased levels of depression.

The Attributional Style Questionnaire (ASQ) was developed back in 1996 to assess whether individuals have the depressogenic attributional style. However, the ASQ has been criticized, with some researchers preferring to use a technique called Content Analysis of Verbatim Explanation (CAVE) in which an individual's ordinary writings are analyzed to assess whether s/he is vulnerable to the depressive attributional style. The key advantage of using content analysis is its non-invasive nature, in contrast to collecting survey answers or simulating social experiences.

=== In sports and health ===
Attribution theory has been applied to a variety of sports and exercise contexts, such as children's motivation for physical activity and African soccer, where attributions are placed toward magic and rituals, such as what magicians are consulted before the game begins, rather than the technical and mechanical aspects of playing football.

Using Heider's classifications for causal attribution, being the locus of causality, stability, and controllability is another way to explain Attribution theory's role in health. Older women make up the largest percentage of inactive people for health reasons. A study was conducted to explain the factors behind low motivation in older women. This study was made up of 37 elderly women with a mean age of 80. Low motivation to exercise and be healthy has been noted to be caused by internal factors such as old age. The combination of internal factors, mixed with a stable response, complimented by the fact that old age is uncontrollable, causes low motivation, especially in elderly women, which leads to health problems. Attributional retraining allowed these women to reconsider external factors as controllable, which decreased their feelings of helplessness by 50% and increased their perceived control over their health.

In sports psychology, attribution theory is like a tool that helps us understand why people think and act the way they do, especially when it comes to sports. Back in the 1970s and 1980s, lots of researchers were interested in attribution theory, but since then, not as many studies have been done on it. Still, it's important because it helps us figure out why athletes think certain things about their performance. Heider started it all by showing how people try to explain why things happen, like why someone does well or badly in a game. This idea is important in sports because athletes are always trying to understand why they did well or not so well.

Other researchers like Jones, Davis, and Kelley built on Heider's work. They came up with ideas about how we figure out what other people are like based on what they do. This is important in sports, too, because coaches and teammates are always trying to understand each other. And then there are other ideas, like Rotter's work on how what we expect to happen affects how we behave. This is important for understanding why some athletes feel like they can improve while others don't.

One big idea in attribution theory is about how we think about problems. Weiner talks about how we see problems as either something we can change or something we can't. This affects how we feel and how we think we can do in the future. For example, if we see a problem as something we can't change, we might feel like we can't do anything to get better. But if we see it as something we can work on, we might feel more hopeful about improving.

Attribution theory, which explores how individuals interpret events like winning and losing, is vital for understanding sports performance. Weiner's model of attributions offers a framework, highlighting dimensions such as locus, stability, and controllability. Combat sport athletes tend to attribute successes more internally and stably, while their attributions for failures are less internalized. The research also uncovers attribution biases like the self-serving bias, where successes are attributed internally and failures externally. Through qualitative and quantitative analyses, the study emphasizes situational factors and individual differences in attributions. By examining Croatian combat sport competitors, the research enriches the attribution literature and provides insights for optimizing athletic performance.

The study by Vanek and Hosek in 1970 compared abstract figures and realistic pictures in assessing athletes' judgments. Their findings favored realistic pictures for accuracy. Similarly, the current study employs visual stimuli to evaluate perceptual skills, with a focus on dynamic elements in videos. Factors like viewing time and distance are considered, with accuracy being the primary measure of success. This approach sheds light on how the visual system processes information in different contexts. Time is crucial in measuring perceptual success, highlighting the importance of accuracy over speed.

=== In education ===
Attribution theory has been used to research motivation in educational contexts such as mathematics The way in which teachers attribute behavior can impact their response to problematic children.

Laurent Brun, Benoit Dompnier, and Pascal Pansu conducted a study examining interpersonal relationships in Attribution theory. Using Weiner's three dimensions of stability theory, locus of causality, and controllability, they were able to reasonably infer what behaviors teachers attribute toward their students' success. They assigned five profiles to teachers after the study, and they determined that these profiles were "greatly determined by the student's outcome valence." Teachers are more often to blame students' failures on internal reasons, such as an inability or disregarding of lessons, rather than potentially accepting external factors, like poor teaching strategies, that are leading a student toward "failing" in school. Similar profiles can explain why students succeed in class. However, teachers are more likely to accept external sources when students are doing well when compared to struggling students. The findings suggest that humans are more likely to praise themselves for others' success than be critical of themselves when they are teaching others.

As stated before, the characteristics of attribution theory directly influence the motivation of student learning, more specifically, students learning English as a foreign language. Studies conducted in Algeria and Eastern Japan share different results when analyzing speaking tasks and oral expressions of EFL. Questionnaires were used to analyze student attribution reflected in outcomes of speaking tasks. In the study from Algeria, the majority of students believed success was achieved through their effort/ability, but failure was a result of external factors. Moreover, Japanese EFL stunts attributed oral task struggles to historically negative attitudes toward Japanese speakers of English, low pay of translators, and emphasis on grammar translation in schools, which are all external factors. However, both studies found that teachers affect causal attributions of students, and teacher feedback can positively or negatively influence learning motivation."

Attribution theory looks at how people explain the reasons behind successes and failures, and it's being used a lot to study motivation in education. Most of the research has been more about theories than real-life evidence. More recently, the plans to focus on college students by using a big survey to see how different ways of thinking about success and failure affect their confidence in school. Confidence is important because when students blame themselves for failing, it can hurt their motivation. while giving credit for success to things like good teaching might make them feel less confident. Teachers also play a role since they often blame students' failures on personal issues (like not trying hard enough) but giving credit for success to outside factors (like suitable teaching methods). Understanding how teachers and students think about success and failure can help create better ways to keep students motivated and confident.

=== In the deaf community ===
Many people with hearing loss reject hearing aids as a result of internal and external motivations. The framework of attribution theory provides insight into experiences and perspectives of individual reasoning of hearing aid non-use and contributes to better effectiveness in the field of hearing healthcare. A study conducted by Caitlyn Ritter of the mega journal 'PLOS ONE' answers the question: What reasons do adults with hearing loss, who are prescribed hearing aids, provide for not using them? Results of the data were collected from 20 participants, highlighting nine themes that influenced hearing aid non-use. Among the internal motivations of non-use include non-necessity, stigmatization, lack of integration, and lack of knowledge about hearing aids. Moreover, external motivations for non-use include uncomfortableness, cost burden, professional distrust, and priority-setting. The external factors of hearing aid discomfort and the austerity of putting them in lead older adults to refrain from using them. Support and counseling are just as significant as expensive modern technology when referring to the increase in hearing aid usage.".

Consequently, lack of integration into daily living was popular among internal factors that discouraged people from wearing hearing aids. A study conducted on older adults with hearing loss identified perceived stigma as important in influencing decision-making processes and selection of the type of hearing aids and where they should be worn; three interrelated experiences were related to this stigma: self-perception, ageism, and vanity. Ritter's study features Doug, an interviewee, as he explains his use of hearing aids except when he goes on vacation because he tends to forget them. His example is a small but clear barrier to successful integration. Another participant shared they wanted to disguise their physical deficiency if they could and would only wear hearing aids if their hearing loss was severe, but not if they were ugly. In both studies, participants attribute the non-use of hearing aids to going against social norms, influencing a lot of adults with hearing loss to ditch them altogether.

=== In virtual reality ===
Attribution Theory can be applied to virtual reality. Virtual reality is used in countless fields for limitless opportunities. One of which is mimicking the traveling experience. “As a result, the attributions formed by virtual tourists may prioritize virtual social signaling over pragmatic accuracy. Furthermore, the lack of tangible output in virtual experiences means that the lingering effects of those experiences dissolve more quickly without real-world residues to solidify memories." Although virtual reality can be utilized to experience and travel the world, it comes with an empty feeling from not actually being there. Avatar-focused virtual experiences encourage attribution shifts central to attribution theory by leading people to interpret actions based more on online social appearance as opposed to actual impact. This is a flexibility that’s harder to achieve in physical interactions.

=== In test scores ===
Attribution theory can be applied with students and test scores. Weiner states that “After the students perceive reasons for their successes or failures, they then ascribe the reasons in three main dimensions: locus, stability, and control." Attribution theory studies have three commonalities. In education research, attribution has been widely cited as one of the key factors in students’ learning motivation and achievement. The attribution theory model begins with the precursors by remembering their past successes or failures; these past experience justifications may help understand why they could be successful or fail in their language learning. Attribution theory suggests students are more likely to stay motivated and keep working toward their goals when they are able to explain outcomes in terms of internal, changeable, and controllable factors like effort.

=== In museums ===
Attribution theory can be applied in museums to help their efforts in improving the research willingness of their employees. A study was administered across various museums in China. Using attribution theory allows researchers to elucidate the underlying causes and inferences behind the behaviors and expressions exhibited by individuals or groups. The findings explain what motivates young museum staff in mainland China to do research. Using the CEAM framework and ideas from attribution theory, they showed how different factors connect. First, they grouped 14 factors into internal vs. external, then broke them down further based on whether they’re stable or controllable, using insights from interviews.

== Learned helplessness ==
The concept of learned helplessness emerged from animal research in which psychologists Martin Seligman and Steven F. Maier discovered that dogs classically conditioned to an electrical shock which they could not escape, subsequently failed to attempt to escape an avoidable shock in a similar situation. They argued that learned helplessness applied to human psychopathology. In particular, individuals who attribute negative outcomes to external, stable and global factors reflect a view in which they have no control over their situation. It is suggested that this aspect of not attempting to better a situation exacerbates negative mood, and may lead to clinical depression and related mental illnesses.

== Perceptual salience ==
When people try to make attributions about another's behavior, their information focuses on the individual. Their perception of that individual is lacking most of the external factors which might affect the individual. The gaps tend to be skipped over and the attribution is made based on the perception information most salient. The most salient perceptual information dominates a person's perception of the situation.

For individuals making behavioral attributions about themselves, the situation and external environment are entirely salient, but their own body and behavior are less so. This leads to the tendency to make an external attribution in regard to their own behavior.

== COVID-19 pandemic ==
The onset of the COVID-19 pandemic furthered studies relating to Attribution theory. A study conducted by Elvin Yao and Jason Siegel looked further into Weiner's definition of Attribution theory and how people express emotions when the intentional spreading of COVID occurs. The researchers also included a controllability factor that played a part in the perceived intentionality. The results of the study demonstrated high levels of anger and frustration among people who sensed that someone was intentionally spreading COVID-19. These high levels of frustration also led to a desire to punish the person intentionally spreading the virus, especially when the spreader was in complete control of their circumstances and knowledge of their actions. Furthermore, whether or not a "spreader" had control of the factors surrounding the spreading of the virus, as long as the person had a high perceived intentionality then other people responded with anger. This study shows when the intentions of a person are perceived to be negative to society, then people respond negatively.

== Criticism ==
Attribution theory has been criticized as being mechanistic and reductionist for assuming that people are rational, logical, and systematic thinkers. The fundamental attribution error, however, demonstrates that they are cognitive misers and motivated tacticians. It also fails to address the social, cultural, and historical factors that shape attributions of cause. This has been addressed extensively by discourse analysis, a branch of psychology that prefers to use qualitative methods including the use of language to understand psychological phenomena. The linguistic categorization theory for example demonstrates how language influences our attribution style.

== See also ==
- Abductive reasoning – Inference seeking the simplest and most likely explanation
- Attribution bias – Systematic errors made when people evaluate their own and others' behaviors
- Explanatory style – Psychological attribute
- Locus of control – Concept in psychology
- Naïve realism – Human tendency to believe that we see the world around us objectively
- Psychological projection – Attributing parts of the self to others
- Religious attribution
- Self-disorder – Mental state of a reduced perception of self-awareness
- Trait ascription bias – Psychological tendency
