= Bernard Weiner =

American social psychologist (born 1935)

Bernard Weiner (born 1935) is an American social psychologist known for developing a form of attribution theory which seeks to explain the emotional and motivational entailments of academic success and failure. His contributions include linking attribution theory, the psychology of motivation, and emotion.

== Life and career ==
Weiner received his undergraduate degree in Liberal Arts from the University of Chicago in 1955 and an MBA, majoring in Industrial Relations, from the same university in 1957. Following two years of service in the U.S. Army, Weiner enrolled in a PhD program in personality at the University of Michigan, where he was mentored by John Atkinson, one of the leading personality and motivational psychologists of that era. Weiner completed his PhD in 1963, and spent two years as an assistant professor at the University of Minnesota before joining the psychology faculty at the University of California at Los Angeles (UCLA) in 1965, where he remained active into the early 2000s.

Weiner has published 15 books and many articles on the psychology of motivation and emotion, and has been a professor at the University of California, Los Angeles since 1965.

He is the father of Mark Weiner, a professor of law at Rutgers School of Law–Newark.

== Research ==
Professor Weiner's primary research interests are Social Cognition, Helping, Prosocial Behaviour, Judgment and Decision Making, Motivation, Goal Setting, Causal Attribution, Law and Public Policy, Interpersonal Processes and Emotion, Mood, Affect. Weiner got interested in the field of attribution after studying achievement motivation. He used TAT to identify differences in people's achievement needs and then turned to the study of individual issues people face when they think of their own successes and failures. He further conducted research into the cognitive processes that have motivational influence.

=== Attribution theory ===
Attribution theory seeks to explain the causes of an event or behavior. A three stages process, they are observations, determination of behavior, and attributing to causes. There are two types of attributions, namely external and internal. External attribution relates causality to outside agents, whereas, internal attribution assigns the person himself for any behavior. In a 1996 interview, Weiner elaborated how attribution contributes to "high ability, high achievement, and giftedness", stating that "other-perception and self-perception form a unity, together, which influence task persistence and, therefore, actual ability."

According to Weiner, everyone has similar psychodynamics in the classroom and students tend to seek explanation for personal failure.

Weiner raised the question on what is considered sin and what is sickness. The example he gave surrounded obesity: obesity due to overeating is a sin; obesity because of a thyroid problem is a sickness. Bernard hoped that these types of scenarios would help him come up with a general theory of social conduct.

== Publications and partial bibliography ==
- Weiner, B (1985). "'Spontaneous' causal thinking". Psychological Bulletin. 97 (1): 74–84. doi:10.1037/0033-2909.97.1.74. PMID 3983298.
- Weiner, B. (1986). An attributional theory of motivation and emotion. New York: Springer-Verlag.
- Weiner, B. (1992). Human Motivation: Metaphors, Theories, and Research. Sage Publications. ISBN 0-7619-0491-3
- Weiner, B (1985). "An attributional theory of achievement motivation and emotion" (PDF). Psychological Review. 92 (4): 548–573. doi:10.1037/0033-295x.92.4.548. PMID 3903815. S2CID 6499506. Archived from the original (PDF) on 2020-10-27.
- Weiner, B. (1981). Theories of Motivation: From Mechanism to Cognition. Markham Publishing Company. ISBN 0-528-62018-5
- Weiner, B. (2005). Social Motivation, Justice, And The Moral Emotions: An Attributional Approach. Lawrence Erlbaum Associates. ISBN 0-8058-5527-0
- Weiner, B. (1995). Judgments of Responsibility: A Foundation for a Theory of Social Conduct. The Guilford Press. ISBN 0-89862-843-1
- Weiner, B. (2003). The Classroom as a Courtroom
