= Religious attribution =

Religious attribution in social psychology refers to how individuals use religious explanations in order to explain or understand a particular experience or event that otherwise could not be understood by natural causes.

The term religious attribution is derived from the more general attribution theory of social psychology, which seeks to explain human interpretations and understandings of events and circumstances. The attribution process is motivated by a desire to perceive events in the world as meaningful, and the desire to predict or control events.

There are several examples of religious interpretation being used to explain events. These include: The mercy and justice of God, the devil, religious rituals, and effective or ineffective prayers. A miracle is an example of an event that is often attributed to supernatural causality due to the lack of natural or scientific explanation.

== Types of religious attributions ==
=== Naturalistic attributions ===
Also known as natural kinds or naturalism, naturalistic attributions are an individual's explanation and understanding of events that match their intuition of how the world works. These events are explained by natural causes. The simplest way to explain something as being religiously attributed (or supernatural) is because it violates the expectations of naturalist attribution that cannot be explained.

=== Religious attributions ===
Events and circumstances are more likely to be given a religious attribution when the said events and circumstances cannot be explained by naturalistic attributions. Scholars in the field of cognitive science of religion study religious thought and behavior, like religious attribution, from the perspective of cognitive science.

The likelihood of choosing a religious attribution rather than a naturalistic attribution for a particular experience or event is determined by an individual's need for meaning, a sense of control over events, and the individual's self-esteem. The Religious Attribution process gives individuals a greater sense of control over events than naturalistic attributions when there are threats to life and security- the simple idea of having faith gives people a greater sense of control over outcomes. Religious attribution also gives individuals self-esteem in the form of personal security, often including a general side toward self-enhancement.

Different event characteristics will influence whether or not an individual chooses between religious and naturalistic attributions. These characteristics include the degree to which an event can be explained with an individual's current belief system, the degree to which religious and naturalistic attributions seem to be effective, and the degree to which religious and naturalistic explanations represent sources of self-esteem in an individual. Another effect on the religious attribution process is group pressure and the extent to which other people in such a setting directly or indirectly encourage or discourage the use of religious attributions.

== Use ==
Use of religious attribution stems from basic motivational themes that underlie much religious thinking and behavior—the human need for meaning, control and esteem. The nature of people makes us "need to know" things, and we need for control and mastery of our lives. Research suggests people assign causality to maintain and enhance their self-esteem. Attributions are triggered when meanings and control are unclear, and self-esteem is challenged.

=== Influences ===
Situational factors that combine and intertwine play a significant role in the prevalence and use of religious attribution. These situational influences fall into the broad categories of contextual factors and event-character factors. Contextual factors are concerned with the degree to which situations are religiously structured i.e. was the person at church? In deep prayer? Event character factors are concerned with the nature of the event. Research on contextual factors found the salience of religion in general seems to be the largest influence. This suggests the availability heuristic is important and that religious influence in situations increases the probability of making religious attributions.

=== Importance of event ===
People attribute things that are beyond their control, such as the death of a loved one and natural disasters, to God. All of these things can be explained with religious attribution by saying it is God's will. Science cannot answer questions like "why me", which people seem to ask whenever something momentous happens in their lives.

=== Positivity vs. negativity of event ===
Positivity and negativity of an event are important to consider because people often attribute events to God but do not often blame God for negative occurrences. Attributions to God are overwhelmingly positive.

=== Event domain ===
Event domains are important when explaining attribution. Some domains are "ready made" for the application of secular understanding while others seem more appropriate for invoking religious possibilities; for example medical situations elicit more religious attributions than other social or economic circumstances.

=== Personal relevance ===
Events occur to the person are much more personally important than when they happen to others. A person may be upset or deeply concerned when something bad happens to a friend but may ask "why me" when he or she is the centre of the event. If something good happens for someone else, like a lottery win, we may say "well that is lucky" and be happy for the person. A positive event that happens to a person may be interpreted as "God looking out for me"; personal relevance elicits more religious attribution.

== Historical Examples ==
=== Emperor Constantine ===
Emperor Constantine was instituted as the Emperor of Rome in 306 AD. He became Emperor during a time of conflict and civil war in the Roman Empire. Due to this fact, he was engaged in several civil wars across Rome. He was fighting his brother in law Maxentius who had taken possession of Rome According to a biography written by Eusebius, Constantine was unsure of which god to pray to for guidance. He chose to pray to his father's god who he said had helped him when other gods had failed. That same day, Constantine and his army witnessed a cross shaped glowing symbol over the sun with the words written next to it: "By This Conquer." Constantine was unsure how to interpret this sight at the time. According to Eusebius, Constantine had a vision that night. In the vision, Jesus Christ appeared and told him to use the cross as a symbol of protection against his enemies. Constantine obeyed this vision and ordered all of his soldiers to use the symbol of the cross. His army was then victories at the Battle of Milvian Bridge where he defeated Maxentius. Constantine then attributed this victory to the divine intervention of the Christian God and proceeded to make Christianity the national religion of Rome.

=== Christopher Columbus ===
Christopher Columbus was a European explorer who set out on a voyage in 1492-1493 to discover new land beyond the European seas. He found success in his voyages and colonized various parts of the Americas and the Caribbean. Christopher Columbus was a Catholic and attributed his success not based solely on his own skills as a sailor, but to God for blessing his voyage. Columbus was quoted to have said: "I have seen and truly I have studied all books–cosmographies, histories, chronicles, and philosophies, and other arts, for which our Lord unlocked my mind, sent me upon the sea, and gave me fire for the deed. Those who heard of my emprise called it foolish, mocked me, and laughed. But who can doubt but that the Holy Ghost inspired me?"

== Users ==
People who attend church frequently, have knowledge in their faith, and hold importance of faith highly are more likely to rely more heavily on religious attribution than would people who are less religious. The more conservatively religious or orthodox the home and family in which a person is reared, the greater the person's likelihood of using religious attributions later in life. Some research claims Protestants will turn to internal or religious attribution more often than more-orthodox Catholics on average.

=== Self-esteem and locus of control ===
Religion has a relationship with self-esteem and locus of control. In general, people with high self-esteem relate more positive and loving images to God whereas people with low self-esteem may not do this because they feel God has been unloving and cold to them. Locus of control is explained with two modes. The deferring mode, where people believe all power resides with God, would be a low locus of control. In the self-directive mode, the person is active and God plays a passive role in which they share power. People who use the latter mode tend to draw stronger associations to God then do people with low locus of control.
