= Quirino Navarro =

Filipino nuclear physicist and chemist (1936–1997)

Quirino O. Navarro
- Born: 29 March 1936
- Died: 19 December 1997 (aged 61)
- Education: University of the Philippines; University of California
- Known for: Research on isotopes of Californium, Dysprosium and Einsteinium
- Scientific career
- Fields: Nuclear physics, Chemistry

Quirino O. Navarro (29 March 1936 – 19 December 1997) was a Filipino nuclear physicist and chemist who studied isotopes of californium, dysprosium, and einsteinium. His work was published in two books and three volumes and even became useful for teaching students in the University of California. In 1956 he graduated from the University of the Philippines with a bachelor's degree in chemistry and by 1962 he got his Ph.D. in nuclear chemistry from the University of California.

Navarro died on 19 December 1997, at the age of 57.
