= Scope neglect =

Cognitive bias

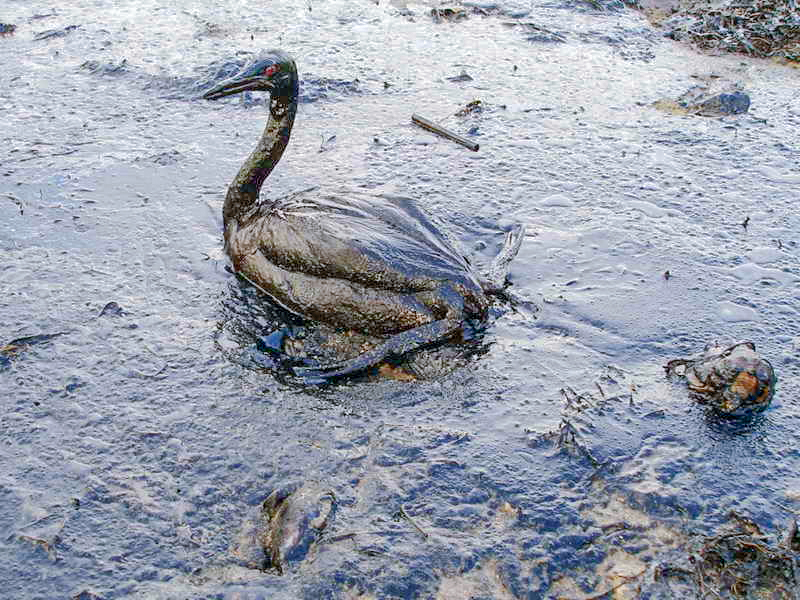
A bird covered in oil during an oil spill

Scope neglect or scope insensitivity is a cognitive bias that occurs when the valuation of a problem is not valued with a multiplicative relationship to its size. Scope neglect is a specific form of extension neglect.

== Research ==
In one study, respondents were asked how much they were willing to pay to prevent migrating birds from drowning in uncovered oil ponds by covering the oil ponds with protective nets. Subjects were told that either 2,000, or 20,000, or 200,000 migrating birds were affected annually, for which subjects reported they were willing to pay $80, $78 and $88 respectively. Other studies of willingness-to-pay to prevent harm have found a logarithmic relationship or no relationship to scope size.

The psychologist Daniel Kahneman explains scope neglect in terms of judgment by prototype, a refinement of the representativeness heuristic. "The story [...] probably evokes for many readers a mental representation of a prototypical incident, perhaps an image of an exhausted bird, its feathers soaked in black oil, unable to escape", and subjects based their willingness-to-pay mostly on that mental image.

Psychologist Paul Slovic has conducted research on the phenomenon of mass numbing which is closely linked to scope neglect. Mass numbing occurs when individuals cannot properly conceptualize harms affecting a large number of people and give these harms less importance than the same harm occurring to one identifiable person.

== Implications ==
=== Existential risks ===
Philosopher Toby Ord argues that scope neglect can explain why the moral importance of existential risks to humanity is frequently underweighted relative to the stakes involved. In his book The Precipice: Existential Risk and the Future of Humanity, Ord refers explicitly to scope neglect and provides the following example for the bias:

[W]e tend to treat nuclear war as an utter disaster, so we fail to distinguish nuclear wars between nations with a handful of nuclear weapons (in which millions would die) from a nuclear confrontation with thousands of nuclear weapons (in which a thousand times as many people would die, and our entire future may be destroyed).

Eliezer Yudkowsky previously made similar remarks regarding the effect of scope neglect on the public perception of existential risks.

=== Wild animal suffering ===
Wild animal suffering refers to the pain and distress experienced by animals in natural environments, often caused by predation, disease, starvation, environmental hazards, or injury. This suffering can be widespread, as individuals of many species face constant survival challenges in the wild. Some have argued that discussions about wild animal suffering are frequently unduly overshadowed by concerns about domesticated animals or human welfare. Scope neglect might play a role in this, as the large scale of suffering in the wild can be difficult for people to fully comprehend, leading to reduced moral consideration.

== See also ==
- List of cognitive biases
- Duration neglect
- Insensitivity to sample size
- Law of triviality
