= Peak–end rule =

Psychological heuristic

The peak–end rule is a psychological heuristic in which people judge an experience largely based on how they felt at its peak (i.e., its most intense point) and at its end, rather than based on the total sum or average of every moment of the experience. The effect occurs regardless of whether the experience is pleasant or unpleasant. To the heuristic, other information aside from that of the peak and end of the experience is not lost, but it is not used. This includes net pleasantness or unpleasantness and how long the experience lasted. The peak–end rule is thereby a specific form of the more general extension neglect and duration neglect.

== Overview ==
The peak–end rule is an elaboration on the snapshot model of remembered utility proposed by Barbara Fredrickson and Daniel Kahneman. This model dictates that an event is not judged by the entirety of an experience, but by prototypical moments (or snapshots) as a result of the representativeness heuristic. The remembered value of snapshots dominates the actual value of an experience. Fredrickson and Kahneman theorized that these snapshots are actually the average of the most affectively intense moment of an experience and the feeling experienced at the end. The effects of the duration of an experience upon retrospective evaluation are extremely slight. Fredrickson and Kahneman labeled this phenomenon duration neglect. The peak–end rule is applicable only when an experience has definite beginning and end periods.

== Research and examples ==
A 1993 study titled "When More Pain Is Preferred to Less: Adding a Better End" by Kahneman, Fredrickson, Charles Schreiber, and Donald Redelmeier provided groundbreaking evidence for the peak–end rule. Participants were subjected to two different versions of a single unpleasant experience. The first trial had subjects submerge a hand in 14 °C water for 60 seconds. The second trial had subjects submerge the other hand in 14 °C water for 60 seconds, but then keep their hand submerged for an additional 30 seconds, during which the temperature was raised to 15 °C. Subjects were then offered the option of which trial to repeat. Against the law of temporal monotonicity, subjects were more willing to repeat the second trial, despite a prolonged exposure to uncomfortable temperatures. Kahneman et al. concluded that "subjects chose the long trial simply because they liked the memory of it better than the alternative (or disliked it less)."

Similarly, a 1996 study by Kahneman and Redelmeier assessed patients' appraisals of uncomfortable colonoscopy or lithotripsy procedures and correlated the remembered experience with real-time findings. They found that patients consistently evaluated the discomfort of the experience based on the intensity of pain at the worst (peak) and final (end) moments. This occurred regardless of length or variation in intensity of pain within the procedure.

Another study by Kahneman and Ziv Carmon identified a boundary condition for the peak–end rule. Participants interacted with a computer program that had them wait to be served, while assessing their satisfaction as they were waiting. Kahneman and Carmon found that how participants felt at the final moment of the experience was a good predictor of their responses when they were asked to retrospectively evaluate their experiences. For example, participants who felt very dissatisfied during much of the experience but were satisfied in the final few seconds (because the waiting line moved faster than expected toward the end) summarized the experience as satisfying. Kahneman and Carmon concluded that real time experiences that are based on expectations are discounted after the fact if those expectations are unfulfilled.

A third study by Kahneman, Redelmeier, and Joel Katz corroborated and expanded upon the discoveries made in the 1996 study. Colonoscopy patients were randomly divided into two groups. One underwent a colonoscopy procedure wherein the scope was left in for three extra minutes, but not moved, creating a sensation that was uncomfortable, but not painful. The other group underwent a typical colonoscopy procedure. Kahneman et al. found that, when asked to retrospectively evaluate their experiences, patients who underwent the longer procedure rated their experience as less unpleasant than patients who underwent the typical procedure. Moreover, the patients in the prolonged discomfort group were far more likely to return for subsequent procedures because a less painful end led them to evaluate the procedure more positively than those who faced a shorter procedure.

== Causes ==
=== Memory bias for more emotional events (i.e., why the peak is memorable) ===
People exhibit better memory for more intensely emotional events than less intensely emotional events. The precise cause of this is unclear, but it has been demonstrated, for decades, across a wide variety of surveys and experiments. In addition, people do not always recognize that the events that they remember are more emotionally intense than the "average" event of its kind. This failure to correct for the atypicality of extreme memories can lead people to believe those extreme moments are representative of the "set" being judged. Boston Red Sox fans asked to recall any one game they saw when the Red Sox won, for example, tended to recall the best game they could remember. They only realized this game was unrepresentative of past winning games by the Red Sox if they were explicitly asked to recall the best game they could remember, as evidenced by their subsequent affective forecasts. This bias for more intense emotional experiences is evident in nostalgic preferences. People asked to recall a television show or movie from the past tend to recall the most enjoyable show or movie that they can remember, and use this extreme example to rate all shows from its era unless they are also able to spontaneously recall shows or movies that are worse than the first show or movie they remember.

=== Recency bias in memory (i.e., why the end is memorable) ===
People exhibit serial position effects such that they have better memory for both the beginning and end of sequences, phenomena known as primacy bias and recency bias, respectively. A paper by Garbinsky, Morewedge, and Shiv (2014) found evidence that for extended hedonic experiences, better memory for the end of the experience than the beginning (recency > primacy) can be attributed to memory interference effects. As a person eats potato chips, for example, the formation of a new memory of the most recently eaten chip makes it harder for them to recall how the previously eaten chips tasted. Garbinsky and colleagues found that (1) recency effects better predicted recalled enjoyment of a small meal (e.g., eating 5 or 15 chips) than did primacy effects, (2) that people had a worse memory for the first bite of the meal than the last bite of the meal, but (3) providing people with their ratings of the first bite lead them to use their enjoyment of that first bite as much as their enjoyment of the last bite when rating their overall enjoyment of the meal.

== Applications ==
=== Business ===
==== Customer Service ====
Since most consumer interactions have set beginnings and ends, they fit the peak–end model. As a consequence, negative occurrences in any consumer interaction can be counteracted by establishing a firmly positive peak and end. This can be accomplished through playing music customers enjoy, giving out free samples, or paying a clerk to hold the door for patrons as they leave. As Scott Stratten has suggested, "A really great salesperson who helps with an exchange can erase negative experiences along the way. The long wait in line and the bad music in the changing room are forgotten". However, as research by Talya Miron-Shatz suggests, retrospective evaluations of day-long experiences do not appear to follow the peak–end rule, which brings into question the applicability of this rule to approximately day-length consumer–business interactions, such as hotel stays.

==== Pricing Strategy ====
Another business application is the price setting strategy in marketing practice. The peak-end rule suggests that reference price, an internal price benchmark, is formed as a weighted average of the highest observed price and the most recent price. Among all four reference price models (the peak-end model, extrapolative expectations model, adaptive expectations model, and rational expectations model), the peak-end model is the most plausible representation of consumer's cognitive processes at an individual level.

De Maeyer and Estelami suggest that occasionally raising the price of the brand above the desirable level may restore the reference price for the brand. However, due to its inherent risks, this tactic may only be effective under certain circumstances. First, the tactic should be used only sparingly and for a short period. If the brand adjusts its price level too often, it could confuse customers and may be regarded as "unreliable". A long period of exceptionally high price may distort consumers' price perceptions on the brand and result in a loss of consumers. Second, the tactic is best suited to frequently purchased products (e.g., food, music, fragrance) where the frequency of sales minimizes the impact of the lost sale during the peak-price period.

Another study by Nasiry and Popescu examines the effect of low peak price and its interaction with loss aversion in optimal pricing strategies. They discovered that steep discounts could permanently erode demand in the future, as lowest prices remain salient in the memory anchoring process. Thus, companies should avoid deep discounts to maintain their brand price perception. They also pointed out the limitation of temporary price-raising strategy as being short-lived because these high prices affect only the reference price in the next period.

==== Turnover ====
A study by Kang, Daniels, and Schweitzer proposed a "streak-end rule" which extends the peak-end rule to sequences of binary events. They argued that, for sequences of binary events (such as workers being repeatedly assigned to do tasks that are either hard or easy), streaks are the psychological analogue of peaks. They found that volunteer workers' turnover decisions were disproportionately influenced by "streaks" (i.e., when a worker experienced many hard tasks in a row) and "ends" (i.e., when a worker's most recent task was a hard task).

=== Vacations ===
In 2006, a study was carried out at the University of Canterbury in Christchurch, New Zealand, analyzing the implications of the peak–end rule on the perceived happiness experienced on vacations. The study found that participants' remembered overall happiness was approximately predicted by the peak–end rule, although it was actually better predicted by their happiness during the "most memorable or most unusual 24-h period". Still, the duration of a vacation appeared to have negligible effects on remembered happiness. The results of the study could be applied to choosing more economical durations for vacations.

=== Medical procedures ===
The peak–end rule is particularly salient in regard to medical procedures, since it suggests that it is preferable to have longer procedures that include a period of decreased discomfort than to have shorter procedures. In particular, the rule "suggests that the memory of a painful medical treatment is likely to be less aversive if relief from the pain is gradual than if relief is abrupt". Furthermore, the quality of a remembered procedure can drastically influence medical futures. If people recall necessary but onerous procedures more positively, then they are more likely to return for repeat procedures later in life. However, factoring the effect of the peak–end rule upon evaluations of medical procedures is problematic, since adding a period of decreasing pain to a procedure is still added pain. Even though this certainly yields a better memory of the process, the patient still endures more pain than is strictly necessary. Doctors and patients are forced to confront the choice between objectively less painful forms of treatment and forms of treatment that will be remembered more favorably. Kahneman claims that "it is safe to assume that few patients will agree to expose themselves to pain for the sole purpose of improving a future memory".

=== Education ===
The peak-end rule also applies to educational practice, especially to peer assessment. A study by Hoogerheide and his team analyzes the effects of the peak-end rule in children's experience of receiving peer assessments. The result shows that the peak-end rule likely influences children's perception and memory of the assessment as well as their learning outcomes and motivation.

The study contains two experiments with different overall tones, one positive and one negative. In each experiment, students received two versions of assessments with different lengths. In the overall negative assessment, the extended version comprises an extra moderately negative rating at the end. Similarly, the extended positive assessment ends with an additional moderately positive rating. In both experiments, the students reported that the extended assessment was remembered as more pleasant and less difficult to deal with. Based on the result, Hoogerheide advises that teachers should structure the feedback by ending with the best part of the assessment. When the assessment is overall negative, it is better to end with the most pleasant or most easily acceptable part of the negative feedbacks. Similarly, the positive assessment should end on a high note rather than the most unpleasant part.

=== Restaurants ===
While the peak-end rule in human eating behavior may not be as general as in other contexts, studies have discovered some contextual factors that are influenced by the rule. For example, the peak-end rule works for the evaluation of food when the price is low. Conversely, for expensive food, people tend to rely on their initial experience rather than the peak or end experience. A potential reason is that high-price payers form a higher expectation on the service than low-price payers do. If their high expectation initially deviates from the actual experience, the valuation on the overall service could be driven primarily by the beginning experience. Those paying low price may not have much expectation and therefore consider the peak to be much higher than high-price payers do. Thus, they are more likely to be influenced by the peak-end rule when evaluating the overall experience.

The theory is formed in a pizza study where people chose to pay $4 or $8 for their pizza buffet. For those paid $4, both the tastes of the last and the peak slices significantly predict the general evaluation for overall food taste. In contrast, for those paid $8, the first slice is more important in predicting the overall enjoyment. Therefore, in order to maximize customer satisfaction, higher-priced restaurants should put their best food in front of the consumer first. In a buffet setting, they could provide some signage to make more popular items salient or place the most popular foods first in the line. In lower-priced restaurants, serving tasty desserts at the end may increase customer's overall satisfaction.

The effect of the peak-end rule in eating behavior also depends on personal factors such as self-restraint level on food choice. Robinson et al. discovered that for unrestrained eaters key moments in eating experiences have a disproportionately large influence on remembered enjoyment of eating. However, restrained eaters' judgements on food are not influenced by the peak or end of the recent eating experience but by other cognitive factors such as semantic knowledge and beliefs about food that are already formed.

== Criticism ==
Critiques of the peak–end rule typically derive from its conflation of a complex mental evaluation into a simplistic framework. A 2008 study found some support for the peak–end rule, but also found that it was "not an outstandingly good predictor" of remembered experiential value, and that the happiness of the most memorable part of an experience predicted remembered happiness better than did the happiness of the peak or of the end. Additionally, the extreme effect of peaks fades more rapidly over time, causing peaks to be recalled less positively and troughs recalled less negatively over time. Episodic memory endures for only a few weeks; at some point, mental accounting shifts over to semantic memory, leading to potential over-valuation of the "end" and diminished weighting of the peak. Additionally, memories that are available for evaluation may change due to the fading affect associated with memory or differing goals in recall. Goal orientation or initial expectations can also affect the weighting of a peak or an end, causing an end to be over-weighted as the culmination of a goal. Finally, Ariely and Carmon have theorized that evaluations of past events are affected by feelings at the time of evaluation.

== See also ==
- Emotion and memory
- List of cognitive biases
