= Less-is-better effect =

Cognitive bias

The less-is-better effect is a cognitive bias that causes people to favor a lesser option when it is presented separately, but to prefer the better option when both are presented together. The term was first proposed by Christopher Hsee.

== Identifying the effect ==
In a 1998 study, Hsee, a professor at the Graduate School of Business of The University of Chicago, discovered a less-is-better effect in three contexts:

"(1) a person giving a $45 scarf (from scarves ranging from $5-$50) as a gift was perceived to be more generous than one giving a $55 coat (from coats ranging from $50-$500);

(2) an overfilled ice cream serving with 7 oz of ice cream was valued more than an underfilled serving with 8 oz of ice cream;

(3) a dinnerware set with 24 intact pieces was judged more favourably than one with 31 intact pieces (including the same 24) plus a few broken ones."

Hsee noted that the less-is-better effect was observed "only when the options were evaluated separately, and reversed itself when the options were juxtaposed.” Hsee explained these seemingly counterintuitive results “in terms of the evaluability hypothesis, which states that separate evaluations of objects are often influenced by attributes that are easy to evaluate rather than by those that are important."

== Other studies ==
Research on the less-is-better effect and related judgement patterns has examined how people and other primates evaluate different options.

In a 1992 study, Michael H. Birnbaum and colleagues found that participants sometimes assigned a higher value to a gamble offering a 95% chance of winning $96 and a 5% chance of winning nothing than to a gamble offering the same 95% chance of winning $96 and a 5% chance of winning $24. Although the second gamble offered a better possible outcome, participants sometimes valued it less.

In a 1994 study Max H. Bazerman and colleagues examined how social comparisons influenced evaluations of hypothetical job offers. When participants evaluated a single offer, they placed greater importance on how their salary compared with other employees' salaries. When comparing multiple offers, participants placed greater importance on their own salary.

A 1995 study by Victoria Husted Medvec, Scott F. Madey, and Thomas Gilovich found that Olympic bronze medalists generally appeared happier than silver medalists. The researchers attributed this difference to counterfactual thinking: silver medalists tended to compare their results with winning gold, while bronze medalists compared theirs with winning no medal.

In a 1996 study, Christopher K. Hsee examined how people evaluated two used music dictionaries. One contained 10,000 entries and had an intact cover, while the other contained 20,000 entries but had a torn cover. When participants evaluated the dictionaries separately, they were willing to pay more on average for the intact dictionary. When comparing both dictionaries side by side, they valued the dictionary with more entries more highly.

A 2014 study by Audrey E. Parrish and Michael J. Beran examined how container size and fullness influenced food quantity judgments in four chimpanzees. The researchers found that the chimpanzees generally selected larger food quantities when the containers were the same size. However, two chimpanzees sometimes preferred smaller portions in fuller-looking containers over larger portions in less-full containers. These findings suggest that the visual presentation of food can influence quantity judgments in nonhuman primates.

A 2023 replication study by Andrew J. Vonasch and colleagues revisited three experiments from Hsee's original 1998 research involving gifts, ice cream, and dinnerware. The researchers replicated the less-is-better effect in all three experiments when participants evaluated options separately. However, results from side-by-side comparisons were less consistent. In particular, participants did not show a statistically significant preference for the larger dinnerware set. Ultimately, while the study found strong evidence that the less-is-better effect holds during separate evaluations, it yielded less consistent support for the idea that joint evaluations lead people to prefer the larger option.

== General observations ==
When consumers assess objects in isolation, they often compare them to other objects in the same category. "It seems that in evaluating a gift, people are neither sensitive to the actual price of the gift, nor to the category of that gift (e.g. whether a coat or a scarf), but they are very sensitive to the relative position of the gift within its category."

Customers tend to be happier when merchants give them a little extra something that costs the merchant relatively little (a bonus scoop of ice cream on a sundae, for example) than when merchants offer a better deal that would cost the merchant more.

== Limitations ==
In Hsee's 1998 experiments, participants demonstrated the less-is-better effect when they evaluated options separately, but not when they compared them side by side.

However, a 2023 study by Audrey E. Parrish and Emma E. Sandgren found that children aged 3 to 9 demonstrated the less-is-better effect even when options were evaluated together. Children sometimes preferred smaller groups containing more desirable items over larger sets containing less desirable items. These findings suggest that the effect may differ between children and adults and that evaluating options together does not always eliminate it.

== Hypothesized causes ==
Theoretical causes of the less-is-better effect include:

- counterfactual thinking – A study found that bronze medalists are happier than silver medalists, apparently because silver invites comparison to gold whereas bronze invites comparison to not receiving a medal.
- evaluability heuristic or fluency heuristic (or both) – Hsee hypothesized that subjects evaluated proposals more highly based on attributes that were easier to evaluate (attribute substitution). Another study found that students preferred funny versus artistic posters according to attributes they could verbalize easily, but the preference was reversed when they did not need to explain a reason. (See also introspection illusion).
- representativeness heuristic or judgment by prototype – People judge things according to average of a set more easily than size, a component of extension neglect. (Note: Kahneman uses the term "less-is-more effect" to indicate the "less-is-better effect".)

== Applications ==
The effect has several practical applications. For example, a speaker expecting about 50 attendees could make an event appear more popular by choosing a room with 50 or fewer seats rather than one with more than 100 seats. A chocolatier is better off selling a box containing 24 pieces of top-quality candy than a box containing those 24 pieces plus 16 lower-quality pieces.

A manufacturer may develop two versions of a product and want to know which consumers will prefer. Presenting both to the public lets consumers evaluate differences between them—while presenting them separately better predicts the consumer's actual experience of the product.

== See also ==
- Contrast effect
- Distinction bias
- Omission bias
