= Donald Redelmeier =

Canadian internist

- Education: Undergraduate degree in mathematics and physics
- Alma mater: University of Toronto Schools; University of Toronto; Stanford University Medical Center

Donald Redelmeier is a Canadian internist, the Canada Research Chair in Medical Decision Sciences and a Professor of Medicine at the University of Toronto. He is most well known for a seminal New England Journal of Medicine paper in 1997 connecting cellphone use and motor vehicle accidents, which has led to laws banning the use of cellphones while driving across the world. He is also known for his work on the peak–end rule and duration neglect. A recent publication showing an increased rate of motor vehicle accidents in patients who refuse vaccination was featured on media outlets around the world.

== Education ==
After graduating from the University of Toronto Schools, Donald Redelmeier attended earned an undergraduate degree in mathematics and physics at the University of Toronto. He completed medical school at the University of Toronto, graduating with a MD in 1984. He completed his internal medicine residency at Stanford University Medical Center in 1987 and a master of science in health services research at Stanford University as a Robert Wood Johnson Scholar in 1989.

== Career ==
He returned to the University of Toronto as a general internist at Sunnybrook Health Sciences Centre in 1989. He is a full-status scientist at the Institute for Clinical Evaluative Sciences and he has published over 200 peer-reviewed publications with over 50,000 citations on his work. Other notable publications include "Mortality among patients admitted to hospitals on weekends as compared with weekdays" (NEJM 2001), “Survival in Academy Award-winning actors and actresses” (Ann Intern Med. 2001), and “Physician warnings for unfit drivers and the risk of trauma from a road crash” (NEJM 2012). His work on decision sciences, including a NEJM paper in 1990 on the effect of cognitive biases can affect physician decision making, has been featured in books such as Deep Medicine by Eric Topol.

Writer Michael Lewis discusses Redelmeier's ideas and work in his book The Undoing Project.

== See also ==
- Daniel Kahneman – psychologist and economist, notable for work on behavioral economics.
- Amos Tversky – cognitive and mathematical psychologist
