= Restraint bias =

Cognitive bias

Restraint bias is the tendency for people to overestimate their ability to control impulsive behavior. An inflated self-control belief may lead to greater exposure to temptation, and increased impulsiveness. Therefore, the restraint bias has bearing on addiction. For example, someone might use drugs, simply because they believe they can resist any potential addiction. An individual's inability to control, or their temptation can come from several different visceral impulses. Visceral impulses can include hunger, sexual arousal, and fatigue. These impulses provide information about the current state and behavior needed to keep the body satisfied.

Empathy Gap Effect: The Empathy Gap Effect deals with individuals having trouble appreciating the power that the impulse states have on their behavior. There is a cold-to-hot empathy gap that states when people are in a cold state, like not experiencing hunger, they tended to underestimate those influences in a hot state. The underestimation of the visceral impulses can be contributed to restricted memory for the visceral experience which means the individual can recall the impulsive state but cannot recreate the sensation of the impulsive state.

Impulse Control and Attention: Studies have concluded that when people believe that they have stronger sense of self-control over situations in their environment, they have greater impulse control. Individuals also tend to overestimate their capacity for self-control when one is told that they have a high capacity for self-restraint. The more someone is told that they have a high capacity for self-restraint, the more they believe it and display higher levels of impulse control. Attention has a lot to do with biases, self and impulse controls in our environment. The less attention an individual pays to something, the less control they have over whatever they are doing. Focusing attention to oneself can lead to successful self-control which can be helpful in many aspects of life. Self-control engages conflict between competing pressures, pressures that can be brought on by situational or internal prompts from the environment. Some of the cues make the individual act on or engage in that behavior or act to prevent the individual from taking action.

== See also ==
- List of cognitive biases
