= Extension neglect =

Error in thinking due to under-valuing the size of a set

Extension neglect (Note: The concept of extensionality is used throughout Kahneman and Tversky's research as synonymous of extent (range, size) of the set. It should not be confused with Arrow's concept of extensionality, which in Kahneman and Tversky's work is called invariance.) is a type of cognitive bias which occurs when the sample size is ignored when its determination is relevant. For instance, when reading an article about a scientific study, extension neglect occurs when the reader ignores the number of people involved in the study (sample size) but still makes inferences about a population based on the sample. In reality, if the sample size is too small, the results might risk errors in statistical hypothesis testing. A study based on only a few people may draw invalid conclusions because only one person has exceptionally high or low scores (outlier), and there are not enough people there to correct this via averaging out. But often, the sample size is not prominently displayed in science articles, and the reader in this case might still believe the article's conclusion due to extension neglect.

Extension neglect is described as being caused by judgment by prototype, of which the representativeness heuristic is a special case.

Forms of extension neglect include:

- base rate neglect
- insensitivity to sample size
- scope neglect
- duration neglect
  - the peak–end rule
- the conjunction fallacy
- the less-is-better effect

The extension effect is "neither universal nor absolute". If attention is drawn to set size in an easily interpretable way, an additive extension effect is reported, according to which the valuation of a set is a function of the valuation of a prototypical member of the set added to set size, rather than multiplied.

== See also ==
- Cognitive bias mitigation
- Cognitive psychology
- Evolutionary psychology
- List of cognitive biases

== Footnotes ==
=== Bibliography ===
- Kahneman, Daniel; Ritov, Ilana; Schkade, David (1999). "Economic Preferences or Attitude Expressions? An Analysis of Dollar Responses to Public Issues" (PDF). Journal of Risk and Uncertainty. 19 (1/3): 203–235. doi:10.1023/A:1007835629236. S2CID 152721073.
- Kahneman, Daniel (2000). "Evaluation by moments, past and future" (PDF). In Kahneman, Daniel; Tversky, Amos (eds.). Choices, Values and Frames. Cambridge University Press. p. 708. ISBN 978-0521627498. Archived from the original (PDF) on 2016-10-09.
