= Empathy gap =

Breakdown in empathy

An empathy gap, sometimes referred to as an empathy bias, is a breakdown or reduction in empathy (the ability to recognize, understand, and share another's thoughts and feelings) where it might otherwise be expected to occur. Empathy gaps may occur due to a failure in the process of empathizing or as a consequence of stable personality characteristics, and may reflect either a lack of ability or motivation to empathize.

Empathy gaps can be interpersonal (toward others) or intrapersonal (toward the self, e.g. when predicting one's own future preferences). A great deal of social psychological research has focused on intergroup empathy gaps, their underlying psychological and neural mechanisms, and their implications for downstream behavior (e.g. prejudice toward outgroup members).

== Classification ==
=== Cognitive empathy gaps ===
Failures in cognitive empathy (also referred to as perspective-taking) may sometimes result from a lack of ability. For example, young children often engage in failures of perspective-taking (e.g., on false belief tasks) due to underdeveloped social cognitive abilities. Neurodivergent individuals often face difficulties inferring others' emotional and cognitive states, though the double empathy problem proposes that the problem is mutual, occurring as well in non-neurodivergent individuals' struggle to understand and relate to neurodivergent people. Failures in cognitive empathy may also result from cognitive biases that impair one's ability to understand another's perspective (for example, see the related concept of naive realism.)

One's ability to perspective-take may be limited by one's current emotional state. For example, behavioral economics research has described a number of failures in empathy that occur due to emotional influences on perspective-taking when people make social predictions. People may either fail to accurately predict one's own preferences and decisions (intrapersonal empathy gaps), or to consider how others' preferences might differ from one's own (interpersonal empathy gaps). For example, people not owning a certain good underestimate their attachment to that good were they to own it.

In other circumstances, failures in cognitive empathy may occur due to a lack of motivation. For example, people are less likely to take the perspective of outgroup members with whom they disagree.

=== Affective empathy gaps ===
Affective (i.e. emotional) empathy gaps may describe instances in which an observer and target do not experience similar emotions, or when an observer does not experience anticipated emotional responses toward a target, such as sympathy and compassion.

Certain affective empathy gaps may be driven by a limited ability to share another's emotions. For example, psychopathy is characterized by impairments in emotional empathy.

Individuals may be motivated to avoid empathizing with others' emotions due to the emotional costs of doing so. For example, according to C. D. Batson's model of empathy, empathizing with others may either result in empathic concern (i.e. feelings of warmth and concern for another) or personal distress (i.e. when another's distress causes distress for the self). A trait-level tendency to experience personal distress (vs. empathic concern) may motivate individuals to avoid situations which would require them to empathize with others, and indeed predicts reduced helping behavior.

== Notable examples ==
=== Intergroup empathy gaps ===
Humans are less likely to help outgroup members in need, as compared to ingroup members. People are also less likely to value outgroup members' lives as highly as those of ingroup members. These effects are indicative of an ingroup empathy bias, in which people empathize more with ingroup (vs. outgroup) members.

Intergroup empathy gaps are often affective or cognitive in nature, but also extend to other domains such as pain. For example, a great deal of research has demonstrated that people show reduced responses (e.g. neural activity) when observing outgroup (vs. ingroup) members in pain. These effects may occur for real-world social groups such as members of different races. In one study utilizing a minimal groups paradigm (in which groups are randomly assigned, ostensibly based on an arbitrary distinction), individuals also judged the perceived pain of ingroup members to be more painful than that of outgroup members.

==== Intergroup schadenfreude ====
Perhaps the most well-known "counter-empathic" emotion—i.e., an emotion that reflects an empathy gap for the target—is schadenfreude, or the experience of pleasure when observing or learning about another's suffering or misfortune. Schadenfreude frequently occurs in intergroup contexts. In fact, the two factors that most strongly predict schadenfreude are identification with one's group and the presence of competition between groups in conflict. Competition may be explicit; for example, one study found that soccer fans were less likely to help an injured stranger wearing a rival team shirt than someone wearing an ingroup team shirt. However, schadenfreude may also be directed toward members of groups associated with high-status, competitive stereotypes. These findings correspond with the stereotype content model, which proposes that such groups elicit envy, thereby precipitating schadenfreude.

=== Occupational burnout ===
Stress related to the experience of empathy may cause empathic distress fatigue and occupational burnout, particularly among those in the medical profession. Expressing empathy is an important component of patient-centered care, and can be expressed through behaviors such as concern, attentiveness, sharing emotions, vulnerability, understanding, dialogue, reflection, and authenticity. However, expressing empathy can be cognitively and emotionally demanding for providers. Physicians who lack proper support may experience depression and burnout, particularly in the face of the extended or frequent experiences of personal distress.

=== Forecasting failures ===
Within the domain of social psychology, "empathy gaps" typically describe breakdowns in empathy toward others (interpersonal empathy gaps). However, research in behavioral economics has also identified a number of intrapersonal empathy gaps (i.e. toward one's self). For example, "hot-cold empathy gaps" describe a breakdown in empathy for one's future self—specifically, a failure to anticipate how one's future affective states will affect one's preferences. Such failures can negatively impact decision-making, particularly in regards to health outcomes. Hot-cold empathy gaps are related to the psychological concepts of affective forecasting and temporal discounting.

== Psychological factors ==
=== Mentalizing processes ===
Both affective and cognitive empathy gaps can occur due to a breakdown in the process of mentalizing others' states. For example, breakdowns in mentalizing may include but are not limited to:

- Mind attribution: People may fail to take another's perspective due to a failure to attribute a mind or agency to that person. Behavioral research has found that individuals are less likely to assign mental states to outgroup compared to ingroup members.
- Episodic simulation: People may find it difficult to empathize with others if they struggle (due to a lack of ability or motivation) to episodically simulate others' mental states—i.e. to imagine events from others' lives which occur at a specific time and place. The ability to engage in episodic simulation is predictive of greater affective empathy and prosocial behavior towards others.

Neural evidence also supports the key role of mentalizing in supporting empathic responses, particularly in an intergroup context. For example, a meta-analysis of neuroimaging studies of intergroup social cognition found that thinking about ingroup members (in comparison to outgroup members) was more frequently related to brain regions known to underlie mentalizing.

=== Gender norms ===
Gender differences in the experience of empathy have been a subject of debate. In particular, scientists have sought to determine whether observed gender differences in empathy are due to variance in ability, motivation, or both between men and women. Research to date raises the possibility that gender norms regarding the experience and expression of empathy may decrease men's willingness to empathize with others, and therefore their tendency to engage in empathy.

A number of studies, primarily utilizing self-report, have found gender differences in men's and women's empathy. A 1977 review of nine studies found women to be more empathic than men on average. A 1983 review found a similar result, although differences in scores were stronger for self-report, as compared to observational, measures. In recent decades, a number of studies utilizing self-reported empathy have shown gender differences in empathy. According to the results of a nationally representative survey, men reported less willingness to give money or volunteer time to a poverty relief organization as compared to women, a finding mediated by men's lower self-reported feelings of empathic concern toward others.

However, more recent work has found little evidence that gender differences in self-reported empathy are related to neurophysiological measures (hemodynamic responses and pupil dilation). This finding raises the possibility that self-reported empathy may not be driven by biological differences in responses, but rather gender differences in willingness to report empathy. Specifically, women may be more likely to report experiencing empathy because it is more gender-normative for women than men. In support of this idea, a study found that manipulating the perceived gender normativity of empathy eliminated gender differences in men and women's self-reported empathy. Specifically, assigning male and female participants to read a narrative describing fictitious neurological research evidence which claimed that males score higher on measures of empathy eliminated the gender gap in self-reported empathy.

=== Trait differences ===
Psychological research has identified a number of trait differences associated with reduced empathic responses, including but not limited to:

- Social dominance orientation: Individuals high in social dominance orientation (SDO; i.e., those who endorse inequality and hierarchy between groups), are more likely to be high in prejudice and have less empathic concern for outgroup members. In addition to predicting greater intergroup empathy bias, high SDO scores correlated with greater counter-empathy (i.e. schadenfreude) toward outgroup targets, including Asian and Black targets (compared to ingroup White targets) when group boundaries were previously made salient, as well as toward competitive outgroup members (compared to ingroup members) in a novel group setting.
- Reduced importance of social ideals and relationships: Reduced familial and religious importance also appear to be predictive of reduced empathic responses. In a sample of adults aged 18 to 35 (N = 722), family importance was positively associated with affective empathy and perspective taking, particularly among non-Hispanic whites. Religious importance was significantly related to affective empathy, especially among Black, Indigenous, and/or People of Color.
- Conservative political orientation: In an analysis of data from the 2004 American General Social Survey, researchers found conservatives to have lower levels of empathy as compared to liberals, but only among individuals with low (vs. high) levels of religiosity.
- Higher social class: Some studies have found that people from upper-class backgrounds are less likely to experience feelings of compassion or to engage in empathetic behaviors, such as helping others. Education may play a role in this, wealthy and low-income students often attend different schools and do not get a chance to interact with one another. There is growing evidence to suggest that greater economic inequality is linked with lower empathy among the wealthy.

== Neural mechanisms ==
=== Neural simulation ===
According to the perception–action-model of empathy, perception–action-coupling (i.e., the vicarious activation of the neural system for action during the perception of action) allows humans to understand others' actions, intentions, and emotions. According to this theory, when a "subject" individual observes an "object" individual, the object's physical movements and facial expressions activate corresponding neural mechanisms in the subject. That is, by neurally simulating the object's observed states, the subject also experiences these states, the basis of empathy.

The mirror neuron system has been proposed as a neural mechanism supporting perception-action coupling and empathy, although such claims remain a subject of scientific debate. Although the exact (if any) role of mirror neurons in supporting empathy is unclear, evidence suggests that neural simulation (i.e., recreating neural states associated with a process observed in another) may generally support a variety of psychological processes in humans, including disgust, pain, touch, and facial expressions.

Reduced neural simulation of responses to suffering may account in part for observed empathy gaps, particularly in an intergroup context. This possibility is supported by research demonstrating that people show reduced neural activity when they witness ethnic outgroup (vs. ingroup) members in physical or emotional pain. In one study, Chinese and Caucasian participants viewed videos of Chinese and Caucasian targets, who displayed neutral facial expressions as they received either painful or non-painful stimulation to their cheeks. Witnessing racial ingroup faces receive painful stimulation increased activity in the dorsal anterior cingulate cortex and anterior insula (two regions which generally activate during the experience of pain.) However, these responses were diminished toward outgroup members in pain. These results replicated among White-Italian and Black-African participants. Additionally, EEG work has shown reduced neural simulation of movement (in primary motor cortex) for outgroup members, compared to in-group members. This effect was magnified by prejudice and toward disliked groups (i.e. South-Asians, Blacks, and East Asians).

=== Oxytocin ===
A great deal of social neuroscience research has been conducted to investigate the social functions of the hormone oxytocin, including its role in empathy. Generally speaking, oxytocin is associated with cooperation between individuals (in both humans and non-human animals). However, these effects interact with group membership in intergroup settings: oxytocin is associated with increased bonding with ingroup, but not outgroup, members, and may thereby contribute to ingroup favoritism and intergroup empathy bias. However, in one study of Israelis and Palestinians, intranasal oxytocin administration improved opposing partisans' empathy for outgroup members by increasing the salience of their pain.

In addition to temporary changes in oxytocin levels, the influence of oxytocin on empathic responses may also be influenced by an oxytocin receptor gene polymorphism, such that certain individuals may differ in the extent to which oxytocin promotes ingroup favoritism.

=== Specific neural correlates ===
A number of studies have been conducted to identify the neural regions implicated in intergroup empathy biases. This work has highlighted candidate regions supporting psychological processes such as mentalizing for ingroup members, deindividuation of outgroup members, and the pleasure associated with the experience of schadenfreude.

==== Role of dmPFC ====
A meta-analysis of 50 fMRI studies of intergroup social cognition found more consistent activation in dorsomedial prefrontal cortex (dmPFC) during ingroup (vs. outgroup) social cognition. dmPFC has previously been linked to the ability to infer others' mental states, which suggests that individuals may be more likely to engage in mentalizing for ingroup (as compared to outgroup) members. dmPFC activity has also been linked to prosocial behavior; thus, dmPFC's association with cognition about ingroup members suggests a potential neurocognitive mechanism underlying ingroup favoritism.

==== Role of anterior insula ====
Activation patterns in the anterior insula (AI) have been observed when thinking about both ingroup and outgroup members. For example, greater activity in the anterior insula has been observed when participants view ingroup members on a sports team receiving pain, compared to outgroup members receiving pain. In contrast, the meta-analysis referenced previously found that anterior insula activation was more reliably related to social cognition about outgroup members.

These seemingly divergent results may be due in part to functional differences between anatomic subregions of the anterior insula. Meta-analyses have identified two distinct subregions of the anterior insula: ventral AI, which is linked to emotional and visceral experiences (e.g. subjective arousal); and dorsal AI, which has been associated with exogenous attention processes such as attention orientation, salience detection, and task performance monitoring. Therefore, anterior insula activation may occur more often when thinking about outgroup members because doing is more attentionally demanding than thinking about ingroup members.

Lateralization of function within the anterior insula may also help account for divergent results, due to differences in connectivity between left and right AI. The right anterior insula has greater connectivity with regions supporting attentional orientation and arousal (e.g. postcentral gyrus and supramarginal gyrus), compared to the left anterior insula, which has greater connectivity with regions involved in perspective-taking and cognitive motor control (e.g. dmPFC and superior frontal gyrus). The previously referenced meta-analysis found right lateralization of anterior insula for outgroup compared to ingroup processing. These findings raise the possibility that when thinking about outgroup members, individuals may use their attention to focus on targets' salient outgroup status, as opposed to thinking about the outgroup member as an individual. In contrast, the meta-analysis found left lateralization of anterior insula activity for thinking about ingroup compared to outgroup members. This finding suggests that left anterior insula may help support perspective-taking and mentalizing about ingroup members, and thinking about them in an individuated way. However, these possibilities are speculative and lateralization may vary due to characteristics such as age, gender, and other individual differences, which should be accounted for in future research.

==== Role of ventral striatum ====
A number of fMRI studies have attempted to identify the neural activation patterns underlying the experience of intergroup schadenfreude, particularly toward outgroup members in pain. These studies have found increased activation in the ventral striatum, a region related to reward processing and pleasure.

== Consequences ==
=== Helping behavior ===
Breakdowns in empathy may reduce helping behavior, a phenomenon illustrated by the identifiable victim effect. Specifically, humans are less likely to assist others who are not identifiable on an individual level. A related concept is psychological distance—that is, we are less likely to help those who feel more psychologically distant from us.

Reduced empathy for outgroup members is associated with a reduction in willingness to entertain another's points of view, the likelihood of ignoring a customer's complaints, the likelihood of helping others during a natural disaster, and the chance that one opposes social programs designed to benefit disadvantaged individuals.

=== Prejudice ===
Empathy gaps may contribute to prejudicial attitudes and behavior. However, training people in perspective-taking, for example by providing instructions about how to take an outgroup member's perspective, has been shown to increase intergroup helping and the recognition of group disparities. Perspective-taking interventions are more likely to be effective when a multicultural approach is used (i.e., an approach that appreciates intergroup differences), as opposed to a "colorblind" approach (e.g. an approach that attempts to emphasize a shared group identity).

== See also ==
- Attention inequality
- Barriers to pro-environmental behaviour
- Compassion fatigue
- In-group and out-group
- Self-categorization theory
- The Fox and the Stork
