= Hot-cold empathy gap =

Cognitive bias

A hot-cold empathy gap is a cognitive bias in which people underestimate the influences of visceral drives and emotions on their own attitudes, preferences, and behaviors. It is a type of empathy gap.

A "hot" state refers to the affectively driven state. In these states, people tend to act impulsively and prioritise short-term demands over long-term consequences. A "cold" state is the absence of affective arousals and visceral drives. The most important aspect of this idea is that human understanding is "state-dependent". For example, when one is angry, it is difficult to understand what it is like for one to be calm, and vice versa; when one is blindly in love with someone, it is difficult to understand what it is like for one not to be (or to imagine the possibility of not being blindly in love in the future). An inability to minimize one's gap in empathy can lead to negative outcomes in medical settings (e.g., when a doctor needs to accurately diagnose the physical pain of a patient).

== History ==
The idea that emotional states distort our understanding of others is not new. In the work of David Hume and Adam Smith, empathy was seen as central to moral philosophy. Adam Smith observed that we cannot directly access what other people feel unless we project our sensory experience onto others' situations. This is an early description of the interpersonal empathy gap.

In modern times, standard economic models assume people's preferences are stable and consistent across different contexts and emotion states. The rational choice theory suggests that agents act to satisfy their long-term preferences. However, these frameworks cannot explain self-destructive behaviours, such as addiction and impulsivity. By the 1970s, behavioural scientists identified an unaddressed gap between cognition and behaviour in standard economic theory, which Nisbett and Ross described as the "most serious failing of modern cognitive psychology".

To bridge this gap, George F. Loewenstein established the theoretical framework of the hot-cold empathy gap and further classified the gap along three dimensions: direction, time, and person.

== Visceral factors ==
According to Loewenstein, the discrepancies between behaviour and perceived self-interest are largely driven by visceral factors. Visceral factors are an array of influences which include hunger, thirst, love, sexual arousal, cravings for the drugs one is addicted to, physical pain, and desire for revenge. Visceral factors have two defining features: they feel pleasurable or aversive, and they change the relative desirability between goods and actions in the moment. Thirst, for example, not only generates negative sensations but also drives an individual to value water more than food.

These drives have a disproportionate effect on decision making and behavior: the mind, when affected (i.e., in a hot state), tends to ignore all other goals in an effort to placate these influences. These states can lead a person to feel "out of control" and act impulsively.

The magnitude of the hot-cold empathy gap depends on the intensity of visceral factors: at low levels of intensity, people are capable of resisting the temptation of visceral drives; at high levels of intensity, visceral drives can be so powerful and often override deliberate decision making. For instance, when exposed to the feared stimulus, people with phobias typically exhibit intense fear and avoidance behaviours despite knowing that the stimulus is objectively unthreatening.

The overriding power of visceral drives serves an essential evolutionary function. Intense visceral drives narrow attention and motivate individuals to address immediate needs, which enhances the chance of survival (e.g. hunger) and reproduction (e.g. sexual desire). However, this adaptive mechanism becomes problematic in modern contexts where many decisions demand more cold-state thinking.

== Classification ==
Hot-cold empathy gaps can be analyzed according to their direction:

1. Hot-to-cold: People under the influence of visceral factors (hot state) do not fully grasp how much their behavior and preferences are being driven by their current state; they think instead that these short-term goals reflect their general and long-term preferences. This leads to impulsive decision-making, such as crimes of passion, where people underestimate the extent to which their behaviours are driven by momentary rage and the extent to which rage would cool off once they delay their actions.
2. Cold-to-hot: People in a cold state have difficulty picturing themselves in hot states, minimizing the motivational strength of visceral impulses. This leads to unpreparedness when visceral forces inevitably arise and fewer efforts to self-control. For example, teenagers overestimate their ability to resist addiction, leading to intake of drugs and cigarettes at present.

They can also be classified in regards to their relation with time (past or future) and whether they occur intra- or inter-personally:

1. intrapersonal prospective: the inability to effectively predict their own future behavior when in a different state. See also projection bias. A paradigm example is when hungry shoppers buy too many groceries because they overestimate how much they'll eat later.
2. intrapersonal retrospective: when people recall or try to understand behaviors that happened in a different state. An example is the "morning after syndrome" when people wake up in the morning and fail to relate with the indulgence last night.
3. interpersonal: the attempt to evaluate behaviors or preferences of another person who is in a state different from one's own. Evidence suggests that people who are themselves thirsty tend to wrongly assume others feel thirsty as well. Loewenstein suggests that people predict other's feelings and behaviours by simulating their own reaction to that state and then adjusting for differences between themselves and the target. It is argued that errors in inter-personal perspective-taking mainly arise from errors in self-simulation rather than the adjustment for individual differences.

== Areas of study ==
=== Medical decision making ===
Hot-cold empathy gaps have diverse impacts on medical diagnosis and treatment.

- The hot-to-cold empathy gap suggests that people tend to make long-term decisions based on their present feelings. The momentary fear and anxiety after diagnosis often drive people to accept bolder treatment. Similarly, people receiving "end-of-life" care reported their will of living based on immediate feelings rather than average feelings across a period of time. Therefore, some argues that, if people fail to predict their own preferences when they are sick, the effectiveness of advance directives will be called into question.
- Hot-cold empathy gaps undermine the treatment of bipolar disorder. Manic patients lose perspective of their depressed state, and vice versa. Patients cannot associate with their previous emotional state, causing non-adherence to drug regimens.
- The physician-patient interpersonal empathy gap results in under-diagnosis and under-medication. Physicians make decisions in a pain-free state that systematically undervalue patients' pain, leading to inadequate pain management (Bernabei, 1998; Cleeland, 1998).

=== Criminal justice ===
The hungry judge effect suggests that judges grant more favourable rulings at the start of the day or after food breaks. The favourable rulings decrease at the end of the session when judges experience hunger. Hunger, a visceral factor, drives judges to act unfavourably in a hot state. After food breaks, mental resources were restored, allowing judges to act rationally in a cold state. However, the original finding has been contested on methodological grounds, highlighting the difficulty of isolating visceral influences from confounding factors in naturalistic settings, such as the case ordering.

=== Addiction ===
George F. Loewenstein explored visceral factors related to addictions like smoking. The factors have to do with drive states which are essential for living – for example, sleepiness and hunger. Loewenstein discovered that addicts mistakenly categorize their addiction as an essential living drive state due to a behavior disorder.

The hot-cold empathy gap explains why people take up addictive substances despite awareness of risks. First-time users in a cold state underestimate the overwhelming desire to continue using drugs in the future, explaining both initial uptake and subsequent relapse. A study found that people in a low-craving (i.e. cold) state significantly underpredicted the value they would place on the tobacco in a high-craving (i.e. hot) state.

== Applications ==
Hot-cold empathy gaps have implications across multiple domains, from consumer behaviour, healthcare to judicial proceedings. These gaps create vulnerabilities that can be exploited. For instance, salespeople capitalize on consumers' visceral states. Similarly, interrogators use hunger, thirst, and sleep deprivation to extract information and confessions. Despite exploitative applications, Loewenstein argues that understanding the hot-cold empathy gap is crucial for better policy design. Rather than simply focusing on willpower, more effective approaches use pre-commitment devices that bind cold-state decisions before the hot state arises.

== See also ==
- Affective forecasting
- Curse of knowledge
- Dual process theory
- Impact bias
- List of cognitive biases
- Omission bias
- Power (philosophy) § Empathy gap
- Projection bias
- Restraint bias
