= Talya Miron-Shatz =

Israeli researcher

- טליה מירון-שץ
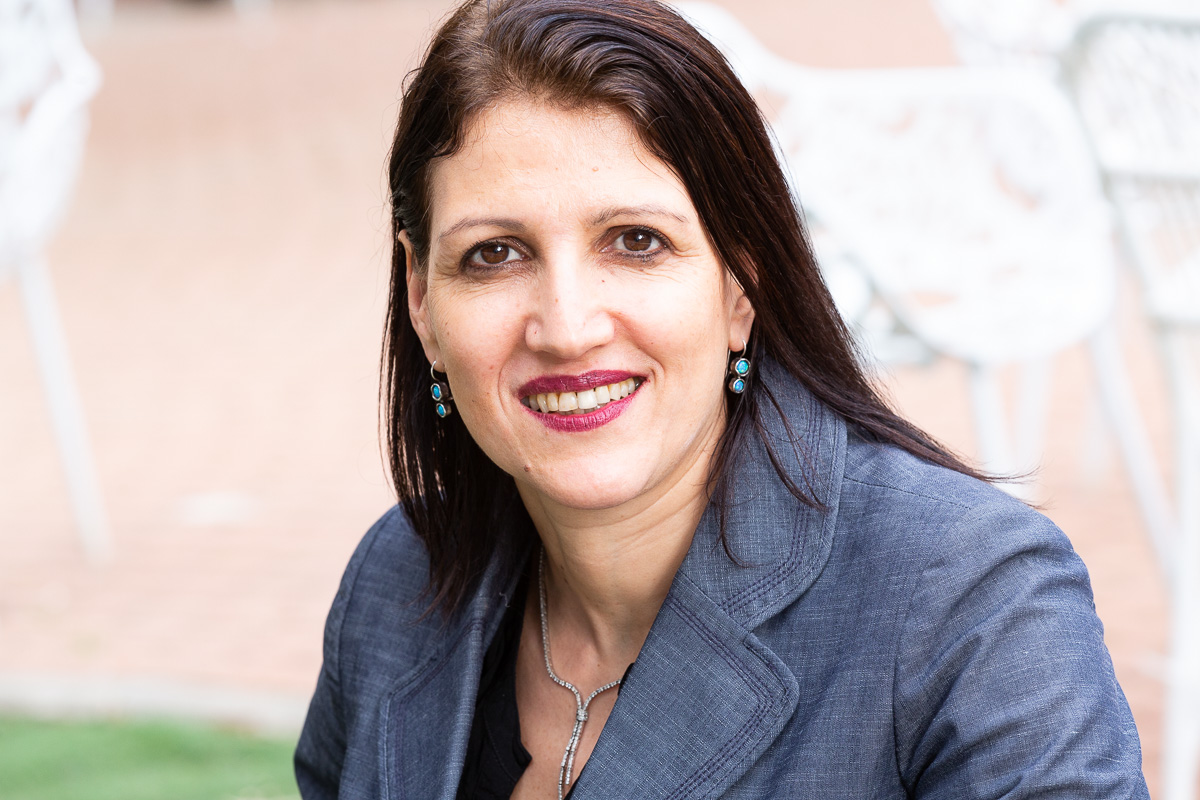
- Miron-Shatz in 2020
- Occupation: Professor at Ono Academic College
- Organization: Ono Academic College
- Website: talyamironshatz.com

Talya Miron-Shatz (Hebrew: טליה מירון-שץ) is an Israeli researcher who specializes in medical decision-making. She is a full professor at the Ono Academic College, a senior fellow at the Center for Medicine in the Public Interest, New York, and a visiting researcher at the Wonton Centre for Risk and Evidence Communication, Cambridge University. Miron-Shatz is a visiting scholar at the University of Cambridge Social Decision-Making Laboratory. She has worked as a consultant in the healthcare industry to companies from health advertising, digital health, wellness, and the pharmaceutical industry.

== Education and career ==
Miron-Shatz was awarded her PhD in psychology from the Hebrew University of Jerusalem in 2005 and conducted her post-doctoral studies at the Center for Health and Wellbeing at Princeton University in the United States, under the supervision of Nobel laureate Daniel Kahneman, until 2009.

From 2008 to 2011, she was an adjunct lecturer and taught consumer behavior to students at the marketing department of the Wharton School, University of Pennsylvania. She is a full professor at the Faculty of Business Administration at the Ono Academic College, where she is the founding director of the Center for Medical Decision Making. She is also a visiting researcher at the Winton Centre for Risk and Evidence Communication at the University of Cambridge, England, as well as at its Social Decision-Making Laboratory.

=== Research ===
The focus of Miron-Shatz's work is how people perceive medical information and medical situations, and the implications for their health. Based on her study of patient knowledge of their own cardiac catherization, Miron-Shatz believes that inclusion in the process is important because "this translates into better adherence to medications and lifestyle changes."

In a New York Times article on COVID vaccine hesitancy, she stated, "Covid has turned us all into amateur scientists... We are all looking at data, but most people are not scientists."

Miron-Shatz has also studied happiness and its determinants, including financial security. Adding to the approach that placed considerable weight on daily activities as determinants of happiness, she has shown that individuals' thoughts and what they are preoccupied with also play a major role in their happiness. She has revealed that subjectively defined peak, and mainly low moments during the day, add to the prediction of happiness. In a study of life satisfaction at milestone ages, based on surveys measuring well-being collected from 800 women in Columbus, Ohio, Miron-Shatz found that women at milestone ages (e.g., 30, 50) were twice as likely to assess their overall happiness in terms of self-reported health.

Her research has been supported by a Marie Curie grant from the European Research Council, grants from the National Institute for Health Policy Research (Israel), The American Association of University Women, FCB, Pfizer Israel, and Pfizer Europe.

=== Writing ===
In 1990, Miron-Shatz published the book My Body Is My Own: A Guide for Dealing with Child Sexual Assault.

Since 2008, she writes the blog "Baffled by Numbers", about navigating information to reach better health decisions, published in Psychology Today.

She also publishes in other venues, such as the American Marketing Association.

In September 2021, Miron-Shatz published her latest book, Your Life Depends on It: What You Can Do to Make Better Choices About Your Health.

=== Consulting ===
Miron-Shatz consults in the sphere of medical decision-making and behavior change in health, involving both prescriber and patient behavior.

She was the co-organizer of the eHealth Venture Summit at MEDICA and ran the Pharma 2.0 series in NYC's Health 2.0 meetup group.

She routinely gives talks at medical industry conferences and for business forum events such as Habit Labs, NY; Digital Health Summit, Philadelphia; Financial Times Digital Health Summit Europe; and Financial Times Digital Health Summit, New York.

== Selected publications ==
=== Books ===
- My Body Is My Own: A Guide for Dealing with Child Sexual Assault (1990)
- Your Life Depends on It: What You Can Do to Make Better Choices About Your Health (2021)

=== Articles ===
- Miron-Shatz, T., Stone, A. A., & Kahneman, D. (2009). :Memories of yesterday's emotions: Does the valence of experience affect the memory-experience gap?" Emotion 9(6), 885-891
- Elwyn, G., & Miron‐Shatz, T. (2010). "Deliberation before determination: the definition and evaluation of good decision making". Health Expectations, 13(2), 139–147.
- Miron-Shatz, T., Diener, E., Moore, T., & Saphire-Bernstein, S. (2013). "Charting the internal landscape: Affect associated with thoughts about major life domains explains life satisfaction". Judgment and Decision Making, 8(5): 603–616.
- Becker, S., Miron-Shatz, T., Schumacher, N., Krocza, J., Diamantidis, C., & Albrecht, U. V. (2014). "mHealth 2.0: experiences, possibilities, and perspectives". Journal of Medical Internet Research, mHealth and uHealth, 2(2), e24.
- Mertens, A., Brandl, C., Miron-Shatz, T., Schlick, C., Neumann, T., Kribben, A., ... & Becker, S. (2016). "A mobile application improves therapy-adherence rates in elderly patients undergoing rehabilitation: A crossover design study comparing documentation via iPad with paper-based control". Medicine, 95(36).
- Barnes, A. J., Hanoch, Y., Miron-Shatz, T., & Ozanne, E. M. (2016). "Tailoring risk communication to improve comprehension: Do patient preferences help or hurt?" Health Psychology, 35(9), 1007.
- Konheim-Kalkstein, Y.L. Miron-Shatz, T. & Israel. L.J. (2018). "How Women Evaluate Birth Challenges: An Analysis of Online Birth Stories". JMIR Pediatrics and Parenting 1(2):e12206 DOI: 10.2196/12206
- Konheim-Kalkstein, Y., & Miron-Shatz, T. (2019). "'If only I had ...': Regrets from women with an unplanned caesarean delivery". Journal of Health Psychology, 1–12.
- Logan Schwarzman, Talya Miron-Shatz, Katherine Maki, Leon Hsueh, Eden Liu, Danit Tarashandegan, Felipe Mendez and Mladen I. Vidovich. (2019). "Shared Decision Making in Radial versus Femoral Catheterization". The American Journal of Cardiology, 124(2).
- Konheim-Kalkstein, Y., & Miron-Shatz, T. (2019). "Preparedness and support, not personality, predict satisfaction in unplanned cesarean births". Journal of Obstetrics and Gynaecology, 1–5.
- Huilgol Y.S., Miron-Shatz, T., Joshi, A.U., & Hollander, J.E. (2019). "Hospital Telehealth Adoption Increased in 2014 and 2015 and Was Influenced by Population, Hospital, and Policy Characteristics". Telemedicine and e-Health
- Miron-Shatz, T., Ormianer, M., Rabinowitz, J., Hanoch, Y., & Tsafrir, A. (2020). "Physician experience is associated with greater underestimation of patient pain". Patient education and counseling, 103(2), 405–409.
- Miron-Shatz, T., Holzer, H., Revel, A., Weissman, A., Tarashandagan, D., Hurwitz, A., Gal, M., Ben-Chetrit, A., Weintraub, A., Ravhon, A., and Tsafrir, A. (2021). "Luckily, I don't believe in statistics: Survey of women's understanding of chance of success with futile fertility treatments". (2020). Reproductive Biomedicine Online 42(2).

== See also ==
- Women of Israel
