= Distinction bias =

Cognitive bias

Distinction bias, a concept of decision theory, is the tendency to view two options as more distinctive when evaluating them simultaneously than when evaluating them separately.

One writer has presented what he called "a simplistic view" of distinction bias: When asked if someone would like an apple, they may say "Yes". So, an apple is placed before them and they begin to eat it and are happy. But what if two apples were placed on the table - one was the one they would have happily eaten and the other which is slightly fresher looking. The individual will choose the fresher apple and eat it and be happy but if asked, "would you have enjoyed eating that other apple", they would likely say "No". Even though in the alternate, no-choice reality they were perfectly happy with the apple. Moreover, if presented with five apples on a table, they might examine each apple so that they would be sure they had the best one, even though the time spent making that decision would be wasted. The reason for this is that distinction bias causes individuals to "over-examine and over-value the differences between things as we scrutinize them."

== Hsee and Zhang ==
The concept of the distinction bias was advanced by Christopher K. Hsee and Jiao Zhang of the University of Chicago as an explanation for differences in evaluations of options between joint evaluation mode and separate evaluation mode (2004). Evaluation mode is a contextual feature in decision making. Joint evaluation mode is when options are evaluated simultaneously, and separate evaluation mode is when each option is evaluated in isolation (e.g., Hsee, 1998; Hsee & Leclerc, 1998). Research shows that evaluation mode affects the evaluation of options, such that options presented simultaneously are evaluated differently from the same options presented separately.

Hsee and Zhang (2004) offered a number of potential explanations for this change in preferences from joint evaluation to separate evaluation, including the distinction bias. The distinction bias suggests that comparing two options, as done in joint evaluation, makes even small differences between options salient. In other words, viewing options simultaneously makes them seem more dissimilar than when viewing and evaluating each in isolation.

When predictions or choices are made, explained Hsee and Zhang in their 2004 paper, people are often in the joint evaluation (JE) mode but when people experience an event, they are often in the single evaluation (SE) mode. The 'utility function' of an attribute can vary between single evaluation and joint evaluation. When people in joint evaluation make predictions or decisions for events to be experienced in single evaluation, they often resort to their joint evaluation preferences rather than single evaluation preferences and over-predict the difference that different values of an attribute will lead their happiness in single evaluation. This over-prediction is referred to as the distinction bias.

== Examples and applications ==
For example, when televisions are displayed next to each other on the sales floor, the difference in quality between two very similar, high-quality televisions may appear great. A consumer may pay a much higher price for the higher-quality television, even though the difference in quality is imperceptible when the televisions are viewed in isolation. Because the consumer will likely be watching only one television at a time, the lower-cost television would have provided a similar experience at a lower cost.

The same calculus can apply when one is choosing between a cheaper store-brand food product and a more expensive brand-name product. In many cases, the difference in taste between the two products would not be worth the difference in price. If the products were sampled in isolation, the difference in taste would be unnoticeable or negligible; consequently, the difference in price, not the difference in taste, ought to determine which choice the consumer makes. In 2010, a magazine asked consumers to try 12 brands of baked beans. Branston won the taste test, followed by Asda, Morrisons, and Heinz. It turned out that some consumers purchased the Heinz beans over the Morrisons beans, at half price of the Heinz beans, claiming taste differences.

One writer has discussed the distinction bias in connection with such matters as choosing a job or a house. When making a choice between an interesting job that pays $60,000 a year and a boring job that pays $70,000 a year or a choice between two equally priced houses, one of them larger but farther from work, the average individual is likely to make false assumptions – for example, that $70,000 will make them feel exactly one-sixth better than $60,000, or that 4,000 square-foot house is one-third better than a 3,000 square-foot house. In reality, on average, we don't actually feel one-sixth better having the extra money or one-third better having the extra space. The more sensible approach, the writer advises in accordance with the research of Hsee and Zhang, is to avoid comparing two jobs, or houses, directly. Instead, consider each job, or house, individually and make an overall assessment of each one on its own, and then compare assessments, which allows them to make a choice that accurately predicts future experience.

== Further studies ==
In 2009, Margaret E. Brooks, Ashley M. Guidroz, and Madhura Chakrabarti reported on two studies in which they had examined the reactions of job applicants to alternative approaches to diversity in employment decisions. The applicants preferred the so-called holistic approaches, and the magnitude of their preference was considerably greater when both approaches were evaluated simultaneously. The researchers found that the results, which they viewed as important for "applicant reactions research, human resource decision making, and policy formation", were consistent with distinction bias.

== See also ==
- Less-is-better effect
