= Duration neglect =

Cognitive bias

Duration neglect is the psychological observation that people's judgments of the unpleasantness of painful experiences depend very little on the duration of those experiences. Multiple experiments have found that these judgments tend to be affected by two factors: the peak (when the experience was the most painful) and how quickly the pain diminishes. If it diminishes more slowly, the experience is judged to be less painful. Hence, the term "peak–end rule" describes this process of evaluation.

Duration neglect is a specific form of the more general extension neglect.

The phenomenon was formally identified by Barbara Fredrickson and Daniel Kahneman (1993), and applies to both pleasant and unpleasant experiences. It is considered a component of affective forecasting, and has practical implications for medicine, consumer behaviour, and the scientific measurement of human wellbeing.

== Background ==
When people evaluate a past experience, they do not mentally replay every moment they lived through. Fredrickson and Kahneman (1993) proposed the snapshot model of remembered utility: rather than treating an experience as a continuous whole, individuals base their overall evaluation on a small number of emotionally representative snapshots - in particular, the most intense moment (the peak) and the final moment (the end) of the experience.

Understanding why this matters requires distinguishing between two ways of experiencing something. The experiencing self registers each moment as it occurs in real time. The remembering self, by contrast, forms a single retrospective verdict on the experience as a whole, and it is this verdict, instead of the real-time record, that guides future decisions. Duration neglect arises because the remembering self constructs its verdict from emotional peaks and ending alone, disregarding everything else. The result is that a longer unpleasant experience is not necessarily remembered as worse than a shorter one, and sometimes may even be remembered as better.

This pattern belongs to a broader category of cognitive biases known as extension neglect, in which the scope or scale of something is discounted when making evaluative judgements. A related example is scope neglect. Research has found that people show similar willingness to pay to protect 2,000 birds as 200,000 birds, demonstrating that the scale of an outcome is routinely discounted in favour of its emotional character.

== Boundaries ==
Duration neglect appears to be limited to unfamiliar experiences. When research participants evaluate experiences with which they are or made familiar, such as a telephone ringing or their regular commute, they appear to be sensitive to the duration of experiences. Similarly, providing participants with a modulus (i.e., a standard of comparison) by which to evaluate the duration of events, also makes them sensitive to duration.

These boundaries suggest that duration neglect is not a fixed feature of memory, but is partially dependent on whether duration information is made available and meaningful to the evaluator. When people lack a clear frame of reference for how long an experience lasted, they rely on emotional peaks and endings. When that frame of reference is provided - through familiarity, comparison, or a fixed standard - duration can once again become a contributing factor.

== Examples ==
In one study, Kahneman and Fredrickson showed subjects pleasant or aversive film clips. When reviewing the clips mentally at a later time, subjects did not appear to take the length of the stimuli into account, instead judging them as if they were only a series of affective "snapshots".

In another demonstration, Kahneman and Fredrickson with other collaborators had subjects place their hands in painfully cold water. Under one set of instructions, they had to keep their hand in the water for an additional 30 seconds as the water was slowly heated to a warmer but still uncomfortably cold level, and under another set of instructions they were to remove their hand immediately. Otherwise, both experiences were the same. Most subjects chose to repeat the longer experience. Subjects apparently judged the experience according to the peak–end rule (in other words, according to its worst and final moments only), paying little attention to duration.

This result is counterintuitive - the longer experience involved more total pain, yet it was the one most participants preferred to repeat.

The strongest clinical evidence for duration neglect was provided by Redelmeier, Katz, and Kahneman (2003) in a randomised controlled trial involving 682 patients undergoing a colonoscopy. Half received a standard procedure; the other half had the colonoscope left stationary in the rectum for an additional period at the end, producing slight discomfort that was less intense than the procedure's peak. Although the extended group experienced more total discomfort, the milder ending lowered the peak-end average of their experience. These patients subsequently rated their procedure as significantly less unpleasant and were more likely to attend a follow-up procedure when one was clinically recommended. The authors concluded that procedure duration "was not significantly associated with patients' retrospective ratings of discomfort," a finding that held even when procedures varied from under ten minutes to over an hour.

== Applications ==
=== Medicine ===
Duration neglect can be observed in medicine, as it may lead patients to be inaccurate when judging whether their symptoms are improving with treatment.

A patient whose condition was severely poor for an extended period but improved drastically towards the end may rate their treatment as more effective than one whose condition improved gradually across the same time period, even if the second patient's overall health gain was greater. Redelmeier (2011) noted that this pattern can distort both individual treatment decisions and broader clinical assessments of how well an intervention has worked.

The colonoscopy trial also raises a practical and ethical implication in healthcare. If deliberately extending a procedure with a less painful period improves a patient's memory of it and increases their likelihood of returning for necessary screening, this benefit comes at the cost of additional discomfort that serves no clinical purpose. Kahneman noted that patients would be unlikely to consent to extra pain simply for the purpose of forming a better memory, yet the impacts of improved remembered experience are real and clinically significant.

=== Wellbeing research ===
Duration neglect poses a challenge for wellbeing research that relies on self-reported data. If survey responses reflect emotional peaks and recent states rather than the quality of experience across a whole period, they may systematically misrepresent how people actually lived through that time. Kahneman described this as a fundamental tension between the experiencing self and the remembering self.

=== Consumer behaviour and design ===
As retrospective judgements weigh peaks and endings disproportionately, organisations designing customer experiences are advised to pay particular attention to how interactions conclude. A long wait followed by an agreeable solution may be remembered more positively than a shorter interaction ending on a neutral note.

== Debiasing ==
Strategies that make duration information more cognitively accessible can partially counteract duration neglect. Liersch and Mckenzie (2009) demonstrated that some forms of duration neglect may be reduced or eliminated by having participants answer in graphical format, or give a rating for every five minutes. Presenting duration information visually rather than numerically was sufficient to eliminate the effect in controlled laboratory settings, suggesting the bias is partly a product of how information is formatted rather than a fixed feature of memory. These findings imply that simple changes to how patients or consumers record experiences may produce evaluations that are more reflective of actual lived experience.

== Criticisms and limitations ==
The robustness of duration neglect has been broadly confirmed but also qualified. A meta-analysis by Alaybek et al (2022), drawing on 174 independent samples, found strong support for the peak-end rule across a wide range of contexts. However, the analysis also found that the average of how an experience felt across its entire duration predicted people's overall evaluations just as well as the peak-end score alone. This suggests that people are not simply ignoring duration, but applying a reasonable summarising heuristic - one that weighs emotionally salient moments as they are genuinely informative about the experience. With this interpretation, duration neglect may reflect an efficient approximation rather than a straightforward error.

The effect is also more reliably demonstrated in between-subjects designs, where different participants evaluate experiences of different lengths without direct comparison. In within-subjects designs, where the same person explicitly compares experiences of varying durations, the effect is considerably weaker. This suggests that duration neglect may depend on whether duration is made salient to the individual making the judgement.

== See also ==
- Peak-end rule
- Extension neglect
- Affective forecasting
- Cognitive bias
- Scope insensitivity
