= List of cognitive biases =

In psychology and cognitive science, cognitive biases are systematic patterns of deviation from norm and/or rationality in judgment. They are often studied in psychology, sociology and behavioral economics.

A memory bias is a cognitive bias that either enhances or impairs the recall of a memory (either the chances that the memory will be recalled at all, or the amount of time it takes for it to be recalled, or both), or that alters the content of a reported memory.

Explanations include information-processing rules (i.e., mental shortcuts), called heuristics, that the brain uses to produce decisions or judgments. Biases have a variety of forms and appear as cognitive ("cold") bias, such as mental noise, or motivational ("hot") bias, such as when beliefs are distorted by wishful thinking. Both effects can be present at the same time.

There are also controversies over some of these biases as to whether they count as useless or irrational, or whether they result in useful attitudes or behavior. For example, when getting to know others, people tend to ask leading questions which seem biased towards confirming their assumptions about the person. However, this kind of confirmation bias has also been argued to be an example of social skill; a way to establish a connection with the other person.

Although this research overwhelmingly involves human subjects, some studies have found bias in non-human animals as well. For example, loss aversion has been shown in monkeys and hyperbolic discounting has been observed in rats, pigeons, and monkeys.

== Organization of cognitive biases ==
Although the reality of these biases is confirmed by reproducible research, there are often controversies about how to classify these biases or how to explain them. Several theoretical causes are known for some cognitive biases, which provides a classification of biases by their common generative mechanism (such as noisy information-processing). Gerd Gigerenzer has criticized the framing of cognitive biases as errors in judgment, and favors interpreting them as arising from rational deviations from logical thought. This list is organized based on the task-based classification proposed by Dimara et al. (2020). This classification defines 6 tasks, namely estimation, decision, hypothesis assessment, causal attribution, recall, and opinion reporting. The biases are further loosely classified into 5 sub-categories or "flavors":

1. Association: a connection between different pieces of information
2. Baseline: comparing something to a perceived standard or starting point
3. Inertia: the reluctance to change something that is already in place
4. Outcome: how well something aligns with an expected or hoped-for result
5. Self-perspective: influenced by one's own personal point of view

== Estimation ==
In estimation or judgement tasks, people are asked to assess the value of a quantity.

=== Association ===
- Aesthetic–usability effect: A tendency for people to perceive attractive things as more usable.
- Attribute substitution: Occurs when a judgment has to be made (of a target attribute) that is computationally complex, and instead a more easily calculated heuristic attribute is substituted. This substitution is thought of as taking place in the automatic intuitive judgment system, rather than the more self-aware reflective system.
- The availability heuristic (also known as the availability bias) is the tendency to overestimate the likelihood of events with greater "availability" in memory, which can be influenced by how recent the memories are or how unusual or emotionally charged they may be. There is a greater likelihood of recalling recent, nearby, or otherwise immediately available examples, and the imputation of importance to those examples over others.
- Conjunction fallacy, the tendency to assume that specific conditions are more probable than a more general version of those same conditions.
- Hot-cold empathy gap, the tendency to underestimate the influence of visceral drives on one's attitudes, preferences, and behaviors.
- Identifiable victim effect, people tend to be more persuaded by a story rather than a statistic or data set.
- Novelty bias, people have difficulty not seeking out the new and shiny thing.
- Tachypsychia: When time perceived by the individual either lengthens or contracts, making events appear to slow down or speed up.
- Time-saving bias, a tendency to underestimate the time that could be saved (or lost) when increasing (or decreasing) from a relatively low speed, and to overestimate the time that could be saved (or lost) when increasing (or decreasing) from a relatively high speed.

=== Baseline ===
- The anchoring bias, or focalism, is the tendency to rely too heavily—to "anchor"—on one trait or piece of information when making decisions (usually the first piece of information acquired on that subject).
- Base rate fallacy or base rate neglect, the tendency to ignore general information and focus on information only pertaining to the specific case, even when the general information is more important.
- Dunning–Kruger effect, the tendency for unskilled individuals to overestimate their own ability and the tendency for experts to underestimate their own ability.
- Gambler's fallacy, the tendency to think that future probabilities are altered by past events, when in reality they are unchanged. The fallacy arises from an erroneous conceptualization of the law of large numbers. For example, "I've flipped heads with this coin five times consecutively, so the chance of tails coming out on the sixth flip is much greater than heads."
- Hard–easy effect, the tendency to overestimate one's ability to accomplish hard tasks, and underestimate one's ability to accomplish easy tasks.
- Hot-hand fallacy (also known as "hot hand phenomenon" or "hot hand"), the belief that a person who has experienced success with a random event has a greater chance of further success in additional attempts.
- Insensitivity to sample size, the tendency to under-expect variation in small samples.
- Interoceptive bias or hungry judge effect: The tendency for sensory input about the body itself to affect one's judgement about external, unrelated circumstances. (As for example, in parole judges who are more lenient when fed and rested.)
- Conservatism or regressive bias: Tendency to remember high values and high likelihoods/probabilities/frequencies as lower than they actually were and low ones as higher than they actually were. Based on the evidence, memories are not extreme enough.
- Subadditivity effect: The tendency to estimate that the likelihood of a remembered event is less than the sum of its (more than two) mutually exclusive components.
- Systematic bias: Judgement that arises when targets of differentiating judgement become subject to effects of regression that are not equivalent.
- Unit bias: The standard suggested amount of consumption (e.g., food serving size) is perceived to be appropriate, and a person would consume it all even if it is too much for this particular person.
- Weber–Fechner law: Difficulty in perceiving and comparing small differences in large quantities.

=== Inertia ===
- Conservatism bias, the tendency to insufficiently revise one's belief when presented with new evidence.

=== Outcome ===
- Exaggerated expectation: The tendency to expect or predict more extreme outcomes than those outcomes that actually happen.
- Hedonic recall bias: The tendency for people who are satisfied with their wage to overestimate how much they earn, and conversely, for people who are unsatisfied with their wage to underestimate it.
- Illusion of validity, the tendency to overestimate the accuracy of one's judgments, especially when available information is consistent or inter-correlated.
- Impact bias: The tendency to overestimate the length or the intensity of the impact of future feeling states.
- Outcome bias: The tendency to judge a decision by its eventual outcome instead of the quality of the decision at the time it was made.
- Planning fallacy, the tendency for people to underestimate the time it will take them to complete a given task.
- Restraint bias, the tendency to overestimate one's ability to show restraint in the face of temptation.
- Sexual overperception bias, the tendency to overestimate sexual interest of another person in oneself, and sexual underperception bias, the tendency to underestimate it.

=== Self-perspective ===
- Curse of knowledge: When better-informed people find it extremely difficult to think about problems from the perspective of lesser-informed people.
- Extrinsic incentives bias, an exception to the fundamental attribution error, where people view others as having (situational) extrinsic motivations, while viewing themselves as having (dispositional) intrinsic motivations.
- False consensus effect, the tendency for people to overestimate the degree to which others agree with them.
- Illusion of transparency, the tendency for people to overestimate the degree to which their personal mental state is known by others, and to overestimate how well they understand others' personal mental states.
- Naïve cynicism, expecting more egocentric bias in others than in oneself.
- Optimism bias: The tendency to be over-optimistic, underestimating greatly the probability of undesirable outcomes and overestimating favorable and pleasing outcomes (see also wishful thinking, valence effect, positive outcome bias, and compare pessimism bias).
- Outgroup homogeneity bias, where individuals see members of other groups as being relatively less varied than members of their own group.
- Pessimism bias: The tendency to overestimate the likelihood that bad things will happen. (compare optimism bias).
- Spotlight effect: The tendency to overestimate the amount that other people notice one's appearance or behavior.
- Worse-than-average effect: A tendency to believe ourselves to be worse than others at tasks which are difficult.

== Decision ==
In decision or choice tasks, people select one option out of several.

=== Association ===
- Ambiguity effect, the tendency to avoid options for which the probability of a favorable outcome is unknown.
- Authority bias, the tendency to attribute greater accuracy to the opinion of an authority figure (unrelated to its content) and be more influenced by that opinion.
- Automation bias, the tendency to depend excessively on automated systems which can lead to erroneous automated information overriding correct decisions.
- Default effect, the tendency to favor the default option when given a choice between several options.
- Dread aversion, just as losses yield double the emotional impact of gains, dread yields double the emotional impact of savouring.
- The framing effect is the tendency to draw different conclusions from the same information, depending on how that information is presented.
- Hyperbolic discounting, where discounting is the tendency for people to have a stronger preference for more immediate payoffs relative to later payoffs. Hyperbolic discounting leads to choices that are inconsistent over time—people make choices today that their future selves would prefer not to have made, despite using the same reasoning. Also known as current moment bias or present bias, and related to Dynamic inconsistency. A good example of this is a study showed that when making food choices for the coming week, 74% of participants chose fruit, whereas when the food choice was for the current day, 70% chose chocolate.
- Compassion fade, the tendency to behave more compassionately towards a small number of identifiable victims than to a large number of anonymous ones.
- Loss aversion, where the perceived disutility of giving up an object is greater than the utility associated with acquiring it. (see also Sunk cost fallacy)
- Neglect of probability, the tendency to completely disregard probability when making a decision under uncertainty.
- Non-adaptive choice switching: After experiencing a bad outcome with a decision problem, the tendency to avoid the choice previously made when faced with the same decision problem again, even though the choice was optimal. Also known as "once bitten, twice shy" or "hot stove effect".
- Prevention bias: When investing money to protect against risks, decision makers perceive that a dollar spent on prevention buys more security than a dollar spent on timely detection and response, even when investing in either option is equally effective.
- Pseudocertainty effect, the tendency to make risk-averse choices if the expected outcome is good but risk-seeking choices if it is bad.
- Risk compensation or Peltzman effect: The tendency to take greater risks when perceived safety increases.
- Zero-risk bias, the preference for reducing a small risk to zero over a greater reduction in a larger risk.

=== Baseline ===
- Action bias: The tendency for someone to act when faced with a problem even when inaction would be more effective, or to act when no evident problem exists.
- Additive bias: The tendency to solve problems through addition, even when subtraction is a better approach.
- Decoy effect, where preferences for either option A or B change in favor of option B when option C is presented, which is completely dominated by option B (inferior in all respects) and partially dominated by option A.
- Ballot order effect, where candidates who are listed first often receive a small but statistically significant increase in votes compared to those listed in lower positions.
- Cheerleader effect, the tendency for people to appear more attractive in a group than in isolation.
- Compromise effect, choices affected if presented as extreme or average
- Denomination effect, the tendency to spend more money when it is denominated in small amounts (e.g., coins) rather than large amounts (e.g., bills).
- Disposition effect, the tendency to sell an asset that has accumulated in value and resist selling an asset that has declined in value.
- Distinction bias, the tendency to view two options as more dissimilar when evaluating them simultaneously than when evaluating them separately.
- Less-is-better effect, the tendency to prefer a smaller set to a larger set judged separately, but not jointly.
- Money illusion: The tendency to concentrate on the nominal value (face value) of money rather than its value in terms of purchasing power.
- Phantom effect: choices affected by dominant but unavailable options.
- Normalcy bias, a form of cognitive dissonance, is the refusal to plan for, or react to, a disaster which has never happened before.
- Projection bias: The tendency to overestimate how much one's future selves will share one's current preferences, thoughts and values, thus leading to sub-optimal choices.
- Scope neglect or scope insensitivity, the tendency to be insensitive to the size of a problem when evaluating it. For example, being willing to pay as much to save 2,000 children or 20,000 children.

=== Inertia ===
- Doubling-back aversion, the tendency for people to avoid retracing their steps or restarting a task, even when doing so would clearly save time or effort, because it feels like undoing past progress rather than making future gains.
- Endowment effect, the tendency for people to demand much more to give up an object than they would be willing to pay to acquire it.
- Escalation of commitment, irrational escalation, or sunk cost fallacy, where people justify increased investment in a decision, based on the cumulative prior investment, despite new evidence suggesting that the decision was probably wrong.
- Functional fixedness, a tendency limiting a person to using an object only in the way it is traditionally used.
- Mere exposure effect or familiarity principle (in social psychology): The tendency to express undue liking for things merely because of familiarity with them.
- Plan continuation bias, failure to recognize that the original plan of action is no longer appropriate for a changing situation or for a situation that is different from anticipated.
- Semmelweis reflex, the tendency to reject new evidence that contradicts a paradigm.
- Shared information bias: The tendency for group members to spend more time and energy discussing information that all members are already familiar with (i.e., shared information), and less time and energy discussing information that only some members are aware of (i.e., unshared information).
- Status quo bias, the tendency to prefer things to stay relatively the same.
- Well travelled road effect, the tendency to underestimate the duration taken to traverse oft-travelled routes and overestimate the duration taken to traverse less familiar routes.

=== Outcome ===
- Present bias: The tendency of people to give stronger weight to payoffs that are closer to the present time when considering trade-offs between two future moments.
- Reactance: The urge to do the opposite of what someone wants one to do out of a need to resist a perceived attempt to constrain one's freedom of choice (see also Reverse psychology).

=== Self-perspective ===
- Effort justification, a person's tendency to attribute greater value to an outcome if they had to put effort into achieving it. This can result in more value being applied to an outcome than it actually has. An example of this is the IKEA effect, the tendency for people to place a disproportionately high value on objects that they partially assembled themselves, such as furniture from IKEA, regardless of the quality of the end product.
- Law of the instrument, an over-reliance on a familiar tool or methods, ignoring or under-valuing alternative approaches. "If all you have is a hammer, everything looks like a nail."
- Not invented here, an aversion to contact with or use of products, research, standards, or knowledge developed outside a group.
- Reactive devaluation: Devaluing proposals only because they purportedly originated with an adversary.
- Social comparison bias: The tendency, when making decisions, to favour potential candidates who do not compete with one's own particular strengths.

== Hypothesis assessment ==
In hypothesis assessment, people determine whether a statement is true or false.

=== Association ===
- Agent detection bias, the inclination to presume the purposeful intervention of a sentient or intelligent agent.
- Availability cascade, a self-reinforcing process in which a collective belief gains more and more plausibility through its increasing repetition in public discourse (or "repeat something long enough and it will become true"). See also availability heuristic.
- Cognitive dissonance is the perception of contradictory information and the mental toll of it.
- Common source bias, the tendency to combine or compare research studies from the same source, or from sources that use the same methodologies or data.
- False priors are initial beliefs and knowledge which interfere with the unbiased evaluation of factual evidence and lead to incorrect conclusions.
- Fluency heuristic: If one object is processed more fluently, faster, or more smoothly than another, the mind infers that this object has the higher value with respect to the question being considered. In other words, the more skillfully or elegantly an idea is communicated, the more likely it is to be considered seriously, whether or not it is logical
- Groupthink, the psychological phenomenon that occurs within a group of people in which the desire for harmony or conformity in the group results in an irrational or dysfunctional decision-making outcome. Group members try to minimize conflict and reach a consensus decision without critical evaluation of alternative viewpoints by actively suppressing dissenting viewpoints, and by isolating themselves from outside influences.
- Groupshift, the tendency for decisions to be more risk-seeking or risk-averse than the group as a whole, if the group is already biased in that direction
- Illusion of explanatory depth, the tendency to believe that one understands a topic much better than one actually does. The effect is strongest for explanatory knowledge, whereas people tend to be better at self-assessments for procedural, narrative, or factual knowledge.
- Illusory truth effect, the tendency to believe that a statement is true if it is easier to process, or if it has been stated multiple times, regardless of its actual veracity. People are more likely to identify as true statements those they have previously heard (even if they cannot consciously remember having heard them), regardless of the actual validity of the statement. In other words, a person is more likely to believe a familiar statement than an unfamiliar one.
- Probability matching: Sub-optimal matching of the probability of choices with the probability of reward in a stochastic context.
- Rhyme as reason effect, where rhyming statements are perceived as more truthful.
- Quantification bias, the tendency to ascribe more weight to measured/quantified metrics than to unquantifiable values. See also: McNamara fallacy.
- Salience bias, the tendency to focus on items that are more prominent or emotionally striking and ignore those that are unremarkable, even though this difference is often irrelevant by objective standards. See also von Restorff effect.
- Saying is believing effect: Communicating a socially tuned message to an audience can lead to a bias of identifying the tuned message as one's own thoughts.
- Selection bias, which happens when the members of a statistical sample are not chosen completely at random, which leads to the sample not being representative of the population.
- Subadditivity effect, the tendency to judge the probability of the whole to be less than the probabilities of the parts.
- Truth bias is people's inclination towards believing, to some degree, the communication of another person, regardless of whether or not that person is actually lying or being untruthful.

=== Outcome ===
- Barnum effect or Forer effect, the tendency for individuals to give high accuracy ratings to descriptions of their personality that supposedly are tailored specifically for them, but are in fact vague and general enough to apply to a wide range of people. This effect can provide a partial explanation for the widespread acceptance of some beliefs and practices, such as astrology, fortune telling, graphology, and some types of personality tests.
- Belief bias, an effect where someone's evaluation of the logical strength of an argument is biased by the believability of the conclusion.
- Berkson's paradox, the tendency to misinterpret statistical experiments involving conditional probabilities.
- Clustering illusion, the tendency to overestimate the importance of small runs, streaks, or clusters in large samples of random data (that is, seeing phantom patterns).
- Confirmation bias, the tendency to search for, interpret, focus on and remember information in a way that confirms one's preconceptions.
- Congruence bias, the tendency to test hypotheses exclusively through direct testing, instead of testing possible alternative hypotheses.
- Extension neglect occurs where the quantity of the sample size is not sufficiently taken into consideration when assessing the outcome, relevance or judgement.
- Gender bias, a widespread set of implicit biases that discriminate against a gender. For example, the assumption that women are less suited to jobs requiring high intellectual ability. Or the assumption that people or animals are male in the absence of any indicators of gender.
- Illusory correlation: Inaccurately seeing a relationship between two events related by coincidence.
- Information bias: The tendency to seek information even when it cannot affect action.
- Observer-expectancy effect, when a researcher expects a given result and therefore unconsciously manipulates an experiment or misinterprets data in order to find it (see also subject-expectancy effect).
- Overconfidence effect, a tendency to have excessive confidence in one's own answers to questions. For example, for certain types of questions, answers that people rate as "99% certain" turn out to be wrong 40% of the time.
- Pareidolia, a tendency to perceive a vague and random stimulus (often an image or sound) as significant, e.g., seeing images of animals or faces in clouds, the man in the Moon, and hearing non-existent hidden messages on records played in reverse.
- Subjective validation, where statements are perceived as true if a subject's belief demands it to be true. Also assigns perceived connections between coincidences. (Compare confirmation bias.)
- Survivorship bias, which is concentrating on the people or things that "survived" some process and inadvertently overlooking those that did not because of their lack of visibility.
- Unconscious bias or implicit bias: The underlying attitudes and stereotypes that people unconsciously attribute to another person or group of people that affect how they understand and engage with them. Many researchers suggest that unconscious bias occurs automatically as the brain makes quick judgments based on past experiences and background.
- Value selection bias: The tendency to rely on existing numerical data when reasoning in an unfamiliar context, even if calculation or numerical manipulation is required.

== Causal attribution ==
In a causal attribution task, people are asked to explain the causes of behavior and events.

=== Outcome ===
- Apophenia: The tendency to perceive meaningful connections between unrelated things.
- Assumed similarity bias: Where an individual assumes that others have more traits in common with them than those others actually do.
- Context neglect bias, the tendency to neglect the human context of technological challenges.
- Domain neglect bias, the tendency to neglect relevant domain knowledge while solving interdisciplinary problems.
- Embodiment bias: Biases in attribution of meaning and perceived properties to objects or events based on the physical capacities and properties of the body, such as sex and temperament
- Form function attribution bias: In human–robot interaction, the tendency of people to make systematic errors when interacting with a robot. People may base their expectations and perceptions of a robot on its appearance (form) and attribute functions which do not necessarily mirror the true functions of the robot.
- G. I. Joe fallacy, the tendency to think that knowing about cognitive bias is enough to overcome it.
- Group attribution error, the biased belief that the characteristics of an individual group member are reflective of the group as a whole or the tendency to assume that group decision outcomes reflect the preferences of group members, even when information is available that clearly suggests otherwise.
- Hostile attribution bias, the tendency to interpret others' behaviors as having hostile intent, even when the behavior is ambiguous or benign.
- Illusory correlation, a tendency to inaccurately perceive a relationship between two unrelated events.
- Illusion of control, the tendency to overestimate one's degree of influence over other external events.
- Intentionality bias, the tendency to judge human action to be intentional rather than accidental.
- Just-world fallacy, the tendency for people to want to believe that the world is fundamentally just, causing them to rationalize an otherwise inexplicable injustice as deserved by the victim(s).
- Motonormativity: Also known as windshield bias, car blindness or car brain. The assumption that motor vehicle use is an unremarkable social norm, causing people to discount harms caused by motor vehicle use compared to similar harms caused by other behaviors.
- Plant blindness: The tendency to ignore plants in their environment and a failure to recognize and appreciate the utility of plants to life on earth.
- Pro-innovation bias: The tendency to have an excessive optimism towards an invention or innovation's usefulness throughout society, while often failing to identify its limitations and weaknesses.
- Proportionality bias: Our innate tendency to assume that big events have big causes, may also explain our tendency to accept conspiracy theories.
- Puritanical bias, the tendency to attribute cause of an undesirable outcome or wrongdoing by an individual to a moral deficiency or lack of self-control rather than taking into account the impact of broader societal determinants.
- Surrogation: Losing sight of the strategic construct that a measure is intended to represent, and subsequently acting as though the measure is the construct of interest.
- System justification, the tendency to defend and bolster the status quo. Existing social, economic, and political arrangements tend to be preferred, and alternatives disparaged, sometimes even at the expense of individual and collective self-interest.
- Teleological bias: The tendency to engage in overgeneralized ascriptions of purpose to entities and events that did not arise from goal-directed action, design, or selection based on functional effects.
- Turkey illusion: Absence of expectation of sudden trend breaks in continuous developments.

=== Self-perspective ===
- Actor-observer bias, the tendency for explanations of other individuals' behaviors to overemphasize the influence of their personality and underemphasize the influence of their situation (see also Fundamental attribution error), and for explanations of one's own behaviors to do the opposite (that is, to overemphasize the influence of our situation and underemphasize the influence of our own personality).
- Defensive attribution hypothesis, a tendency to attribute more blame for a mishap to the person or persons involved if they are perceived as dissimilar to the person making that judgment.
- Egocentric bias: Recalling the past in a self-serving manner, e.g., remembering one's exam grades as being better than they were, or remembering a caught fish as bigger than it really was. Also the tendency to rely too heavily on one's own perspective and/or have a different perception of oneself relative to others.
- Experimenter's or expectation bias, the tendency for experimenters to believe, certify, and publish data that agree with their expectations for the outcome of an experiment, and to disbelieve, discard, or downgrade the corresponding weightings for data that appear to conflict with those expectations.
- False uniqueness bias, the tendency of people to see their projects and themselves as more singular than they actually are.
- Fundamental attribution error, the tendency for people to overemphasize personality-based explanations for behaviors observed in others while under-emphasizing the role and power of situational influences on the same behavior (see also actor-observer bias, group attribution error, positivity effect, and negativity effect).
- Ingroup bias: the tendency for people to give preferential treatment to others they perceive to be members of their own groups.
- Objectivity illusion, the phenomena where people tend to believe that they are more objective and unbiased than others. This bias can apply to itself – where people are able to see when others are affected by the objectivity illusion, but unable to see it in themselves. See also bias blind spot.
- Ostrich effect: The tendency to avoid acknowledgment of an obviously bad situation to avoid the bad feelings that may come with acknowledgment of the situation.
- Outgroup favoritism: When some socially disadvantaged groups will express favorable attitudes (and even preferences) toward social, cultural, or ethnic groups other than their own.
- Pygmalion effect: The phenomenon whereby others' expectations of a target person affect the target person's performance.
- Selective perception, the tendency for expectations to affect perception.
- Self-serving bias, the tendency to claim more responsibility for successes than failures. It may also manifest itself as a tendency for people to evaluate ambiguous information in a way beneficial to their interests (see also group-serving bias).
- Ultimate attribution error, similar to the fundamental attribution error, in this error a person is likely to make an internal attribution to an entire group instead of the individuals within the group.

== Recall ==
In a recall or memory task, people are asked to recall or recognize previous material.

=== Association ===
- Boundary extension: Remembering the background of an image as being larger or more expansive than the foreground
- Childhood amnesia: The retention of few memories from before the age of four.
- Consistency bias: Incorrectly remembering one's past attitudes and behaviour as resembling present attitudes and behaviour.
- Contrast effect, the enhancement or reduction of a certain stimulus's perception when compared with a recently observed, contrasting object.
- Cryptomnesia, where a memory is mistaken for novel thought or imagination, because there is no subjective experience of it being a memory.
- Cue-dependent forgetting context effect: That cognition and memory are dependent on context, such that out-of-context memories are more difficult to retrieve than in-context memories (e.g., recall time and accuracy for a work-related memory will be lower at home, and vice versa).
- Google effect: The tendency to forget information that can be found readily online by using Internet search engines.
- Duration neglect, the neglect of the duration of an episode in determining its value.
- Fading affect bias: A bias in which the emotion associated with unpleasant memories fades more quickly than the emotion associated with pleasant ones.
- False memory, where imagination is mistaken for a memory.
- Humor effect: That humorous items are more easily remembered than non-humorous ones, which might be explained by the distinctiveness of humor, the increased cognitive processing time to understand the humor, or the emotional arousal caused by the humor.
- Implicit association, where the speed with which people can match words depends on how closely they are associated.
- Lag effect: The phenomenon whereby learning is greater when studying is spread out over time, as opposed to studying the same amount of time in a single session. See also spacing effect.
- Levels-of-processing effect: That different methods of encoding information into memory have different levels of effectiveness.
- Leveling and sharpening: Memory distortions introduced by the loss of details in a recollection over time, often concurrent with sharpening or selective recollection of certain details that take on exaggerated significance in relation to the details or aspects of the experience lost through leveling. Both biases may be reinforced over time, and by repeated recollection or re-telling of a memory.
- Memory inhibition: Being shown some items from a list makes it harder to retrieve the other items (e.g., Slamecka, 1968).
- Misinformation effect: Memory becoming less accurate because of interference from post-event information. cf. continued influence effect, where misinformation about an event, despite later being corrected, continues to influence memory about the event.
- Modality effect: That memory recall is higher for the last items of a list when the list items were received via speech than when they were received through writing.
- Repetition blindness: Unexpected difficulty in remembering more than one instance of a visual sequence
- Mood-congruent memory bias (state-dependent memory): The improved recall of information congruent with one's current mood.
- Next-in-line effect: When taking turns speaking in a group using a predetermined order (e.g. going clockwise around a room, taking numbers, etc.) people tend to have diminished recall for the words of the person who spoke immediately before them.
- Part-list cueing effect: That being shown some items from a list and later retrieving one item causes it to become harder to retrieve the other items.
- Peak–end rule: That people seem to perceive not the sum of an experience but the average of how it was at its peak (e.g., pleasant or unpleasant) and how it ended.
- Persistence: The unwanted recurrence of memories of a traumatic event.
- The Perky effect, where real images can influence imagined images, or be misremembered as imagined rather than real
- Picture superiority effect: The notion that concepts that are learned by viewing pictures are more easily and frequently recalled than are concepts that are learned by viewing their written word form counterparts.
- Positivity effect (Socioemotional selectivity theory): Older adults' tendency to favor good over bad information in their memories. See also euphoric recall
- Processing difficulty effect: That information that takes longer to read and is thought about more (processed with more difficulty) is more easily remembered. See also levels-of-processing effect.
- Reminiscence bump: The recalling of more personal events from adolescence and early adulthood than personal events from other lifetime periods.
- Social cryptomnesia, a failure by people and society in general to remember the origin of a change, in which people know that a change has occurred in society, but forget how this change occurred; that is, the steps that were taken to bring this change about, and who took these steps. This has led to reduced social credit towards the minorities who made major sacrifices that led to a change in societal values.
- Source confusion, episodic memories are confused with other information, creating distorted memories.
- Spacing effect: That information is better recalled if exposure to it is repeated over a long span of time rather than a short one.
- Suffix effect: Diminishment of the recency effect because a sound item is appended to the list that the subject is not required to recall. A form of serial position effect. cf. recency effect and primacy effect.
- Suggestibility, where ideas suggested by a questioner are mistaken for memory.
- Telescoping effect: The tendency to displace recent events backwards in time and remote events forward in time, so that recent events appear more remote, and remote events, more recent.
- Testing effect: The fact that one more easily recall information one has read by rewriting it instead of rereading it. Frequent testing of material that has been committed to memory improves memory recall.
- Tip of the tongue phenomenon: When a subject is able to recall parts of an item, or related information, but is frustratingly unable to recall the whole item. This is thought to be an instance of "blocking" where multiple similar memories are being recalled and interfere with each other.
- Verbatim effect: That the "gist" of what someone has said is better remembered than the verbatim wording. This is because memories are representations, not exact copies.
- Zeigarnik effect: That uncompleted or interrupted tasks are remembered better than completed ones.

=== Baseline ===
- Bizarreness effect: Bizarre material is better remembered than common material.
- Frequency illusion or Baader–Meinhof phenomenon. The frequency illusion is that once something has been noticed then every instance of that thing is noticed, leading to the belief it has a high frequency of occurrence (a form of selection bias). The Baader–Meinhof phenomenon is the illusion where something that has recently come to one's attention suddenly seems to appear with improbable frequency shortly afterwards. It was named after an incidence of frequency illusion in which the Baader–Meinhof Group was mentioned.
- List-length effect: A smaller percentage of items are remembered in a longer list, but as the length of the list increases, the absolute number of items remembered increases as well.
- Negativity bias or Negativity effect: The phenomenon of having better recall of unpleasant memories than of pleasant ones. (see also actor-observer bias, group attribution error, positivity effect, and negativity effect).
- Primacy effect: Where an item at the beginning of a list is more easily recalled. A form of serial position effect. See also recency effect and suffix effect.
- Recency effect: A form of serial position effect where an item at the end of a list is easier to recall. This can be disrupted by the suffix effect. See also primacy effect.
- Serial position effect: That items near the end of a sequence are the easiest to recall, followed by the items at the beginning of a sequence; items in the middle are the least likely to be remembered. See also recency effect, primacy effect and suffix effect.
- von Restorff effect: That an item that sticks out is more likely to be remembered than other items.

=== Inertia ===
- Attentional bias, the tendency of perception to be affected by recurring thoughts.
- Continued influence effect: Misinformation continues to influence memory and reasoning about an event, despite the misinformation having been corrected. cf. misinformation effect, where the original memory is affected by incorrect information received later.
- Stereotype bias or stereotypical bias: Memory distorted towards stereotypes (e.g., racial or gender).

=== Outcome ===
- Choice-supportive bias: The tendency to remember one's choices as better than they actually were.
- Declinism: The predisposition to view the past favorably (rosy retrospection) and the future unfavorably.
- Euphoric recall: The tendency of people to remember past experiences favorably while overlooking bad experiences associated with them.
- Hindsight bias: Sometimes called the "I-knew-it-all-along" effect, or the "Hindsight is 20/20" effect, is the tendency to see past events as having been predictable before they happened.
- Recency illusion: The illusion that a phenomenon one has noticed only recently is itself recent. Often used to refer to linguistic phenomena; the illusion that a word or language usage that one has noticed only recently is an innovation when it is, in fact, long-established (see also frequency illusion). Also recency bias is a cognitive bias that favors recent events over historic ones. A memory bias, recency bias gives "greater importance to the most recent event", such as the final lawyer's closing argument a jury hears before being dismissed to deliberate.
- Rosy retrospection: The remembering of the past as having been better than it really was.

=== Self-perspective ===
- Cross-race effect: The tendency for people of one race to have difficulty identifying members of a race other than their own.
- Gender differences in eyewitness memory: The tendency for a witness to remember more details about someone of the same gender.
- Generation effect (Self-generation effect): That self-generated information is remembered best. For instance, people are better able to recall memories of statements that they have generated than similar statements generated by others.
- Placement bias: Tendency to remember ourselves to be better than others at tasks at which we rate ourselves above average (also Illusory superiority or Better-than-average effect) and tendency to remember ourselves to be worse than others at tasks at which we rate ourselves below average (also Worse-than-average effect).
- Self-relevance effect: That memories relating to the self are better recalled than similar information relating to others.

== Opinion reporting ==
In an opinion reporting task, people answer questions regarding their beliefs or opinions on political, moral, or social issues.

=== Association ===
- Halo effect, the tendency for a person's good or bad traits to "spill over" from one personality area to another in others' perceptions of them (see also physical attractiveness stereotype).
- Moral credential effect: Occurs when someone who does something good gives themselves permission to be less good in the future.
- Negativity bias: Social judgments are more influenced by negative information than positive information.

=== Inertia ===
- Backfire effect, a tendency to react to disconfirming evidence by strengthening one's previous beliefs.
- End-of-history illusion: The age-independent belief that one will change less in the future than one has in the past.
- Omission bias: The tendency to judge harmful actions (commissions) as worse, or less moral, than equally harmful inactions (omissions).

=== Outcome ===
- Bandwagon effect, the tendency to do (or believe) things because many other people do (or believe) the same. Related to groupthink and herd behavior.
- Courtesy bias, the tendency to give an opinion that is more socially correct than one's true opinion, so as to avoid offending anyone.
- Illusion of learning, a false belief that if you understand something you learned and acquired a knowledge about it.
- Moral luck, the tendency for people to ascribe greater or lesser moral standing based on the outcome of an event.
- Misinterpreted-effort hypothesis: Perceiving effort as a poor learning.
- Social desirability bias, the tendency to over-report socially desirable characteristics or behaviours in oneself and under-report socially undesirable characteristics or behaviours. See also: § Courtesy bias.
- Stereotyping, expecting a member of a group to have certain characteristics without having actual information about that individual.
- Women are wonderful effect: A tendency to associate more good attributes with women than with men.

=== Self-perspective ===
- Anthropocentric thinking, the tendency to use human analogies as a basis for reasoning about other, less familiar, biological phenomena.
- Anthropomorphism is characterization of animals, objects, and abstract concepts as possessing human traits, emotions, or intentions. The opposite bias, of not attributing feelings or thoughts to another person, is dehumanised perception, a type of objectification.
- Ben Franklin effect, where a person who has performed a favor for someone is more likely to do another favor for that person than they would be if they had received a favor from that person.
- Bias blind spot, the tendency to see oneself as less biased than other people, or to be able to identify more cognitive biases in others than in oneself.
- Illusion of asymmetric insight, where people perceive their knowledge of their peers to surpass their peers' knowledge of them.
- Illusory superiority, the tendency to overestimate one's desirable qualities, and underestimate undesirable qualities, relative to other people. (Also known as "Lake Wobegon effect", "better-than-average effect", or "superiority bias".)
- Impostor Syndrome, a psychological occurrence in which an individual doubts their skills, talents, or accomplishments and has a persistent internalized fear of being exposed as a fraud. Also known as impostor phenomenon.
- Naïve realism, the belief that we see reality as it really is—objectively and without bias; that the facts are plain for all to see; that rational people will agree with us; and that those who do not are either uninformed, lazy, irrational, or biased.
- Third-person effect, a tendency to believe that mass-communicated media messages have a greater effect on others than on themselves.
- Trait ascription bias, the tendency for people to view themselves as relatively variable in terms of personality, behavior, and mood while viewing others as much more predictable.
- Zero-sum bias, where a situation is incorrectly perceived to be like a zero-sum game, in which any gain by one person necessarily comes at the expense of another.

== See also ==
- Abilene paradox – False consensus due to communication failure
- Affective forecasting – Predicting someone's future emotions (affect)
- Anecdotal evidence – Evidence relying on personal testimony
- Attribution (psychology) – Process by which individuals explain causes of behavior and events
- Black swan theory – Theory of response to surprise events
- Chronostasis – Distortion in the perception of time
- Cognitive distortion – Exaggerated or irrational thought pattern
- Defence mechanism – Unconscious psychological mechanism
- Dysrationalia – Inability to think and behave rationally despite adequate intelligence
- Fear, uncertainty, and doubt – Tactic used to influence opinion
- Heuristics in judgment and decision making – Simple strategies or mental processes involved in making quick decisions
- Index of public relations-related articles – Overview of and topical guide to public relations
- Intellectual humility – Recognition of the limit of one's knowledge
- List of common misconceptions
- List of fallacies
- List of maladaptive schemas – List on psychotherapy topic
- List of psychological effects
- Media bias – Bias within the mass media
- Mind projection fallacy – Informal fallacy that the way one sees the world reflects the way the world really is
- Motivated reasoning – Processing personal/social information
- Observational error, also known as Systematic bias – Difference between a measured value of a quantity and its true value
- Outline of public relations – Overview of and topical guide to public relations
- Outline of thought – Overview of and topical guide to thought
- Pollyanna principle – Tendency to remember pleasant things better
- Positive feedback – Loop that increases an initial effect
- Propaganda – Communication used to influence opinion
- Publication bias – Higher probability of publishing results showing a significant finding
- Recall bias – Type of cognitive bias
- Self-handicapping – Cognitive strategy
- Thinking, Fast and Slow – 2011 book by Daniel Kahneman
- Women-are-wonderful effect – Psychological and sociological phenomenon
