= Peak complexity =

Peak complexity is the concept that human societies address problems by adding social and economic complexity but that process is subject to diminishing marginal returns. Adding additional complexity will then impose growing burdens on those societies, making them more vulnerable to external threats.

== Origin and Definitions ==
Who first coined the term is unclear. The first published use of the term may have been by Christopher Burr Jones, in the context of climate change, in 2019, although the term had been used online before that. The 'peak' element refers by analogy to peak oil and peak minerals, although the comparisons are not exact. The concept is credited to Joseph Tainter, who argued that ancients civilisations collapsed because they encountered diminishing marginal returns on complexity. Tainter did not use the term peak complexity, however.

Melia defines peak complexity as: "the diminishing marginal returns, and proliferating unintended consequences, of increasing social or technical complexity."

This definition applies to the process rather than the moment of the peak, which may or may not be reached.

== Evidence for Peak Complexity in Modern Societies ==
Whether they use the specific term or not, several writers have produced evidence to support the view that the growing complexity of modern globalised societies is: becoming less effective at solving problems and/or producing unintended consequences which burden those societies in different ways.

Although Tainter's original work was mainly concerned with ancient civilisations, he and others have subsequently researched what they term the diminishing marginal returns on innovation. By analysing a database of US patent applications, they showed that over time more authors are needed to produce each new patent, and that the impact of each new patent has, on average, declined over time.

Dekker shows how the growing complexity of economic systems makes them more vulnerable to breakdown. This point was made by him and others as a contributor to the 2008 financial crisis.

Melia points to evidence of declining satisfaction with the customer services of large organisations, particularly in the handling of complaints. These problems are caused by information overload and the inability of employees to understand and correct the errors caused by organisations' systems.

== Reasons for Peak Complexity ==
For Tainter, complexification flows from the need for societies to solve problems. The first problems encountered by ancient societies include how to grow food supply, and protect it, to support growing populations. That process leads to the specialisation of labour and technological innovation. It initially produces positive results, so the process continues even when it begins to produce more problems.

Psychologists have identified a cognitive bias known as additive bias, which may explain why human societies tend to complexify over time. Klotz published a series of laboratory experiments demonstrating how subjects presented with a problem are more likely to address it through addition than subtraction, even when subtraction would produce a better outcome.
