= Twelve leverage points =

Systems Dynamics concept

The twelve leverage points to intervene in a system were proposed by Donella Meadows, a scientist and system analyst who studied environmental limits to economic growth.

== History ==
The leverage points, first published in 1997, were inspired by Meadows' attendance at a North American Free Trade Agreement (NAFTA) meeting in the early 1990s, where she realized a very large new system was being proposed but the mechanisms to manage it were ineffective. Meadows, who worked in the field of systems analysis, proposed a scale of places to intervene in a system. Awareness and manipulation of these levers is an aspect of self-organization and can lead to collective intelligence. Her observations are often cited in energy economics, green economics and human development theory.

Meadows started with the observation that there are levers, or places within a complex system (such as a firm, a city, an economy, a living being, an ecosystem, an ecoregion) where a "small shift in one thing can produce big changes in everything" (compare: constraint in the sense of the theory of constraints).

She claimed we need to know about these shifts, where they are, and how to use them. She said most people know where these points are instinctively, but tend to adjust them in the wrong direction. A greater understanding would help solve global problems such as unemployment, hunger, economic stagnation, pollution, resources depletion, and conservation issues.

Meadows started with a nine-point list of such places, and expanded it to a list of twelve leverage points with explanations and examples, for systems in general. She describes a system as being in a certain state, consisting of a stock and flow, with inflows (amounts entering the system) and outflows (amounts leaving the system). At a given time, the system is in a certain perceived state. There may also be a goal for the system to be in a certain state. The difference between the current state and the goal is the discrepancy.

For example, one might consider a lake or reservoir, which contains a certain amount of water. The inflows are the amount of water coming from rivers, rainfall, drainage from nearby soils, and waste water from a local industrial plant. The outflows might be the amount of water used up for irrigation of nearby cornfield, water taken by that local plant to operate as well as the local camping site, water evaporating in the atmosphere, and trickling surplus water when the reservoir is full. Local inhabitants complain about the water level getting low, pollution getting higher, and the potential effect of hot water release in the lake on life (in particular, the fish). This is the difference between the perceived state (pollution or low water level) and the goal (a non-polluted lake).

== Leverage points to intervene in a system ==
The following are in increasing order of effectiveness.

=== 12. Constants, parameters, numbers ===
Parameters are points of lowest leverage effects. Though they are the most clearly perceived among all leverages, they rarely change behaviors and therefore have little long-term effect.

For example, climate parameters may not be changed easily (the amount of rain, the evapotranspiration rate, the temperature of the water), but they are the ones people think of first (they remember that in their youth, it was certainly raining more). These parameters are indeed very important. But even if changed (improvement of upper river stream to canalize incoming water), they will not change behavior much (the debit will probably not dramatically decrease).

=== 11. The size of buffers and other stabilizing stocks, relative to their flows ===
A buffer's ability to stabilize a system is important when the stock amount is much higher than the potential amount of inflows or outflows. In the lake, the water is the buffer: if there's a lot more of it than inflow/outflow, the system stays stable.

For example, the inhabitants are worried the lake fish might die as a consequence of hot water release directly in the lake without any previous cooling off. However, the water in the lake has a large heat capacity, so it's a strong thermic buffer. Provided the release is done at low enough depth, under the thermocline, and the lake volume is big enough, the buffering capacity of the water might prevent any extinction from excess temperature.

Buffers can improve a system, but they are often physical entities whose size is critical and can't be changed easily.

=== 10. Structure of material stocks and flows (such as transport network, population age structures) ===
A system's structure may have enormous effect on operations, but may be difficult or prohibitively expensive to change. Fluctuations, limitations, and bottlenecks may be easier to address.

For example, the inhabitants are worried about their lake getting polluted, as the industry releases chemical pollutants directly in the water without any previous treatment. The system might need the used water to be diverted to a wastewater treatment plant, but this requires rebuilding the underground used water system (which could be quite expensive).

=== 9. Length of delays, relative to the rate of system changes ===
Information received too quickly or too late can cause over- or underreaction, even oscillations.

For example, the city council is considering building the wastewater treatment plant. However, the plant will take 5 years to be built, and will last about 30 years. The first delay will prevent the water being cleaned up within the first 5 years, while the second delay will make it impossible to build a plant with exactly the right capacity.

=== 8. Strength of negative feedback loops, relative to the effect they are trying to correct against ===
A negative feedback loop slows down a process, tending to promote stability. The loop will keep the stock near the goal, thanks to parameters, accuracy and speed of information feedback, and size of correcting flows.

For example, one way to avoid the lake getting more and more polluted might be through setting up an additional levy on the industrial plant based on measured concentrations of its effluent. Say the plant management has to pay into a water management fund, on a weekly or monthly basis, depending on the actual amount of waste found in the lake; they will, in this case, receive a direct benefit not just from reducing their waste output, but actually reducing it enough to achieve the desired effect of reducing concentrations in the lake. They cannot benefit from "doing damage more slowly" -- only from actually helping. If cutting emissions, even to zero, is insufficient to allow the lake to naturally purge the waste, then they will still be on the hook for cleanup. This is similar to the US "Superfund" system, and follows the widely accepted "polluter pays" principle.

=== 7. Gain around driving positive feedback loops ===
A positive feedback loop speeds up a process. Meadows indicates that in most cases, it is preferable to slow down a positive loop, rather than speeding up a negative one.

The eutrophication of a lake is a typical feedback loop that goes wild. In a eutrophic lake (which means well-nourished), much life, including fish, can be supported. An increase of nutrients will lead to an increase of productivity, growth of phytoplankton first, using up as much nutrients as possible, followed by growth of zooplankton, feeding up on the first ones, and increase of fish populations. The more available nutrients there are, the more productivity is increased. As plankton organisms die, they fall to the bottom of the lake, where their matter is degraded by decomposers. However, this degradation uses up available oxygen, and in the presence of huge amounts of organic matter to degrade, the medium progressively becomes anoxic (there is no more oxygen available). In time, all oxygen-dependent life dies, and the lake becomes a smelly anoxic place where no life can be supported (in particular no fish).

=== 6. Structure of information flow (who does and does not have access to what kinds of information) ===
Information flow is neither a parameter, nor a reinforcing or slowing loop, but a loop that delivers new information. It is cheaper and easier to change information flows than it is to change structure.

For example, a monthly public report of water pollution level, especially nearby the industrial release, could have a lot of effect on people's opinions regarding the industry, and lead to changes in the waste water level of pollution.

=== 5. Rules of the system (such as incentives, punishment, constraints) ===
Pay attention to rules, and to who makes them.

For example, a strengthening of the law related to chemicals release limits, or an increase of the tax amount for any water containing a given pollutant, will have a very strong effect on the lake water quality.

=== 4. Power to add, change, evolve, or self-organize system structure ===
Self-organization describes a system's ability to change itself by creating new structures, adding new negative and positive feedback loops, promoting new information flows, or making new rules.

For example, microorganisms have the ability to not only change to fit their new polluted environment, but also to undergo an evolution that makes them able to biodegrade or bioaccumulate chemical pollutants. This capacity of part of the system to participate in its own eco-evolution is a major leverage for change.

=== 3. Goal of the system ===
Changing goals changes every item listed above: parameters, feedback loops, information and self-organization.

A city council decision might be to change the goal of the lake from making it a free facility for public and private use, to a more tourist oriented facility or a conservation area. That goal change will affect several of the above leverage points: information on water quality will become mandatory and legal punishment will be set for any illegal effluent.

=== 2. Mindset or paradigm that the system — its goals, structure, rules, delays, parameters — arises from ===
A societal paradigm is an idea, a shared unstated assumption, or a system of thought that is the foundation of complex social structures. Paradigms are very hard to change, but there are no limits to paradigm change. Meadows indicates paradigms might be changed by repeatedly and consistently pointing out anomalies and failures in the current paradigm to those with open minds.

A current paradigm is "Nature is a stock of resources to be converted to human purpose". What might happen to the lake were this collective idea changed ?

=== 1. Power to transcend paradigms ===
Transcending paradigms may go beyond challenging fundamental assumptions, into the realm of changing the values and priorities that lead to the assumptions, and being able to choose among value sets at will.

Many today see Nature as a stock of resources to be converted to human purpose. Many Native Americans see Nature as a living god, to be loved, worshipped, and lived with. These views are incompatible, but perhaps another viewpoint could incorporate them both, along with others.

== See also ==
- Complexity, Problem Solving, and Sustainable Societies — Joseph Tainter
- Conflict escalation
- Earth's atmosphere
- Focused improvement
- Leverage Point Modeling
- Nature
- Stock and flow
- Systemantics — John Gall
- Theory of constraints
