= Information bias =

Information bias may refer to:

- Information bias (epidemiology), bias arising in a clinical study because of misclassification of the level of exposure to the agent or factor being assessed and/or misclassification of the disease or other outcome itself.
- Information bias (psychology), a type of cognitive bias, involving e.g. distorted evaluation of information.

== See also ==
- Shared information bias
