= Additive bias =

Tendency to solve problems by adding resources

Additive bias is a cognitive urge or tendency of human beings facing problems to add resources instead of taking or subtracting. According to Keith Holyoak, "Humans seeks to strengthen an argument or a manager seeks to encourage desired behaviour, thus requires a mental search for possible changes.

Gabrielle Adams, Ben Converse, Andrew Hales, and Leidy Klotz conducted a series of laboratory experiments, demonstrating how, when faced with a problem, subjects were more likely to add elements rather than subtract, even where subtraction would have led to a better solution. Their research was featured on the cover of Nature magazine when it was published in 2021.

== See also ==
- List of cognitive biases
