= Congruence bias =

Bias from testing only the initial hypothesis

Congruence bias is the tendency of people to over-rely on testing their initial hypothesis (the most congruent one) while neglecting to test alternative hypotheses. That is, people rarely try experiments that could disprove their initial belief, but rather try to repeat their initial results. It is a special case of the confirmation bias.

== Examples ==
Suppose that, in an experimental setting, a subject is presented with two buttons and told that pressing one of those buttons, but not the other, will open a door. The subject adopts the hypothesis that the button on the left opens the door in question. A direct test of this hypothesis would be pressing the button on the left; an indirect test would be pressing the button on the right. The latter is still a valid test because once the result of the door's remaining closed is found, the left button is proven to be the desired button. (This example is parallel to Bruner, Goodnow, and Austin's example in the psychology classic, A Study of Thinking.)

It is possible to apply this idea of direct and indirect testing to more complicated experiments in order to explain the presence of a congruence bias in people's reasoning. Congruence bias could be said to be present if a subject tests their own (usually naive) hypothesis again and again instead of trying to disprove it.

The classic example of subjects' congruence bias was discovered by Peter Wason (1960, 1968). Here, the experimenter gave subjects the number sequence "2, 4, 6", telling the subjects that this sequence followed a particular rule and instructing subjects to find the rule underlying the sequence logic. Subjects provide their own number sequences as tests to see if they could ascertain the rule dictating which numbers could be included in the sequence and which could not. Most subjects quickly assumed that the underlying rule is "numbers ascending by 2", and provide as tests only sequences concordant with this rule, such as "8, 10, 12" or "3, 5, 7" (direct testing). The experimenter would confirm that these sequences are in compliance with the rule they were thinking of. When subjects get confirmatory feedback from repeated testing of the same rule, their confidence in their assumption increases. When the subject offers to the experimenter the hypothesis that the rule is "numbers ascending by 2" they are told that the rule is wrong. Subjects tend to be confused by this, and may attempt to change the wording of the rule without changing its meaning. Some may switch to indirect testing, but have trouble letting go of the "+ 2" convention (e.g., producing potential rules as idiosyncratic as "the first two numbers in the sequence are random, and the third number is the second number plus two"). Many subjects never realize the actual rule. The actual rule used by the experimenter to generate the example and to assess the test sequences provided by the subject was simply "list ascending numbers". Subjects failed to identify the rule due to their inability to consider indirect tests of their hypotheses.

== Cognitive basis ==
Wason attributed this failure of subjects to an inability to consider alternative hypotheses, which is the root of the congruence bias. Jonathan Baron explains that subjects could be said to be using a "congruence heuristic", wherein a hypothesis is tested only by thinking of results that would be found if that hypothesis is true. This heuristic, which many people seem to use, ignores alternative hypotheses.

Baron suggests the following heuristics to avoid falling into the congruence bias trap:

1. Ask "How likely is a yes answer, if I assume that my hypothesis is false?" Remember to choose a test that has a high probability of giving some answer if the hypothesis is true, and a low probability if it is false.
2. "Try to think of alternative hypotheses; then choose a test most likely to distinguish them—a test that will probably give different results depending on which is true." An example of the need for the heuristic could be seen in a doctor's attempting to diagnose appendicitis. In that situation, assessing a white blood cell count would not assist in diagnosis because an elevated white blood cell count is associated with a number of maladies.

== See also ==
- List of cognitive biases
