= Time-saving bias =

Cognitive bias

Time-saving bias is a concept that describes people's tendency to misestimate the time that could be saved (or lost) when increasing (or decreasing) speed.

In general, people underestimate the time that could be saved when increasing from a relatively low speed—e.g., 25 mph (40 km/h) or 40 mph (64 km/h)—and overestimate the time that could be saved when increasing from a relatively high speed—e.g., 55 mph (89 km/h) or 90 mph (140 km/h). People also underestimate the time that could be lost when decreasing from a low speed and overestimate the time that could be lost when decreasing from a high speed.

== Examples ==
In one study, participants were asked to judge which of two road improvement plans would be more efficient in reducing mean journey time. Respondents preferred a plan that would increase the mean speed from 70 to 110 km/h (43 to 68 mph) more than a plan that would increase the mean speed from 30 to 40 km/h (19 to 25 mph), although the latter actually saves more time.

In another study, drivers were asked to indicate how much time they felt could be saved when increasing from either a low (30 mph (48 km/h)) or high (60 mph (97 km/h)) speed. For example, participants were asked the following question: "You are driving along an open road. How much time do you feel you would gain if you drove for 10 miles [16 km] at 40 mph [64 km/h] instead of 30 mph [48 km/h]?". Another question had a higher starting speed of 60 mph (97 km/h), and two other questions asked about losing time when decreasing speed, from either 30 or 60 mph (48 or 97 km/h).

Results supported the predictions of the time-saving bias, as participants underestimated the time saved when increasing from a low speed and overestimated the time saved when increasing from a relatively high speed. In addition, participants also misestimated the time lost when decreasing speed: they generally underestimated the time lost when decreasing from a low speed and overestimated the time lost when decreasing from a relatively high speed.

== Explanation ==
Time savings from extra 10 mph (16 km/h) decrease as speed increases.

The physical formula for calculating the time, $t$, gained when increasing speed is:

$t = c D(v_1^{-1} - v_2^{-1})$

Where $c$ is constant and used to transform between units of measurement, $t$ is the time gained, $D$ is the distance traveled and $v_1$ and $v_2$ are the original and increased speeds, respectively. This formula shows the relationship between increasing speed and journey time is curvilinear: a similar speed increase would result in more time saved when increasing from a low speed compared to a higher speed. For example, when increasing 20 to 30 mph (32 to 48 km/h) the time required to complete 10 miles (16 km) decreases from 30 to 20 minutes, saving 10 minutes. However, the same speed increase of 10 mph (16 km/h) would result in less time saved if the initial speed is higher—e.g., only 2 minutes saved when increasing from 50 to 60 mph (80 to 97 km/h). Changing the distance of the journey from 10 miles (16 km) to a longer or shorter distance will increase or decrease these time savings, but will not affect the relationship between speed and time savings.

Svenson suggested that people's judgments of time-savings actually follow a Proportion heuristic, by which people judge the time saved as the proportion of the speed increase from the initial speed. Another study suggested that people might follow a simpler difference heuristic, by which, they judge the time saved based solely on the difference between the initial and higher speed.

It seems that people falsely believe that journey time decreases somewhat linearly as driving speed increases, irrespective of the initial speed, causing the time-saving bias. Although it is still unclear what is the dominant heuristic people use to estimate time savings, it is evident that almost none follow the above curvilinear relationship.

== Consequences in driving ==
Drivers who underestimated the time saved when increasing from a low speed or overestimated the time lost when decreasing from a high speed, overestimated the speed required for arriving on a specific time and chose unduly high speeds, sometimes even exceeding the stated speed limit. Similarly, drivers who overestimated the time saved when increasing from a high speed underestimated the speed required for arriving on time and chose lower speeds.

== Consequences in other domains ==
The time-saving bias is not limited to driving. The same faulty estimations emerge when people are asked to estimate savings in patients’ waiting time when adding more physicians to a health care center or when estimating an increase in the productivity of a manufacturing line by adding more workers.

== See also ==
- List of cognitive biases
- Amdahl's law
