= Generation effect =

Psychological phenomenon

The generation effect is a psychological phenomenon whereby information is better remembered if it is generated from one's own mind rather than simply read. Researchers have struggled to fully explain why generated information is better recalled than read information, as no single explanation has been comprehensive.

== In experiments ==
The generation effect is typically achieved in cognitive psychology experiments by asking participants to generate words from word fragments. This effect has also been demonstrated using a variety of other materials, such as when generating a word after being presented with its antonym, synonym, picture, arithmetic problems, or keyword in a paragraph. The generation effect has been found in studies using free recall, cued recall, and recognition tests. In one study, the subject was provided with a stimulus word, the first letter of the response, and a word relating the two. For example, with the rule of the opposite, the stimulus word "hot", and the letter "c", the word cold would be generated. This methodology has since been used in the majority of experiments investigating the generation effect.

== Causes ==
=== Lexical activation hypothesis ===
According to the lexical activation hypothesis, the participant must search their semantic memory during the process of generation. The search activates semantic features in memory that are related to the target item. During the retrieval of the target item at testing, the semantic features serve as retrieval cues and aid in the recall of the target item. One study done by Payne, Neely, and Burns further tested this hypothesis. Their research question was: will the generation effect occur for words only or also for non-words? To test this, they studied 168 Purdue undergraduate students. The researchers divided the participants up into two groups. The first group had a word or non-word pairs that rhymed and were told to read both out loud. The second group had a word or non-word and the first letter of the next followed by blanks, and were told to read the first word out loud and generate a word that rhymed with the first word and started with the letter presented. The results were as expected. Participants were only generating words rather than non-words according to the lexical activation hypothesis.

=== Procedural account ===
The procedural account, which builds upon the lexical activation hypothesis, argues that people are more likely to engage in particular cognitive procedures during the encoding of items when generating than when reading. The process of generation induces people to connect the item to information in memory (unlike the lexical activation hypothesis, the information in memory does not necessarily reside in the lexicon). The generation effect occurs if the procedures used during encoding are reinstated during the memory test. The procedural account is also linked to transfer-appropriate processing in that they both cause or do not cause the generation effect depending on encoding and retrieval processes.

=== Multi factor transfer-appropriate processing account ===
According to the multi factor transfer-appropriate processing account, the generation task forces participants to focus their processing on the type of information needed to solve the generation task. When a later test is sensitive to the same type of information, a generation effect occurs. However, when there is not a match between the type of information processed to solve the generation task and the type of information needed to do well on a later test, the generation effect does not occur. For example, a participant that is required to generate same-category targets from distinctive semantic cues (e.g., PURR-C_T, SADDLE-H_RS_) is likely to notice similarities between the targets (e.g., they are all animals). This type of manipulation would promote whole-list relational processing, which may enhance generation performance on a free recall test. Other manipulations can emphasize cue-target processing, thus helping generation performance on cued recall tests.

It has been found that the generation effect was invariable across the different types of memory encoding.

== Limitations ==
By manipulating materials or instructions, experimenters have reduced or eliminated the generation effect. This suggests that there are instances in which reading can have the same memorial gains as generating. For example, when participants are given instructions to process information in a manner that was similar to the processing performed by the participants in the generate condition, the generation advantage between the groups was eliminated. In another study, participants who used a processing strategy (imagery) that was more effective than reading performed just as well as those who generated.

Although the generation effect is a robust finding, there are some studies that have found no memorial benefits of generating compared to reading. For example, one study did not find a generation effect when they used legal non-words and found a reduced generation effect when they used material unfamiliar to the participants. They concluded that generating may have limited effectiveness when applied to new or unfamiliar material. This warrants some concern because if the generation effect is to be incorporated into educational practices such as classroom teaching, we would want it to help students learn new material.

It is possible that the generation effect may cause a trade-off in encoding item information and associative information. The processing of item-specific features of the target item may be enhanced when generating, and generating may also enhance the processing of cue-target relation. But, encoding requires limited-capacity resources, so the better encoding of one type of information may occur at a cost to the encoding of other information. This also has implications for applying generation to educational practices because even if generation improves the recall of specific words, the memory for the contextual information surrounding those words may suffer.

== Practical applications ==
The generation effect might prove to be a useful strategy for learning, especially for remembering educational material. Researchers at UCLA and UC Berkeley are investigating ways to incorporate learning strategies that include the generation effect, as well as other "desirable difficulties", into the classroom.

Using flashcards is one of the ways that generation effect could be utilized to aid in memory retention.

== Exceptions ==
There are several reports in the literature that suggest that individuals diagnosed with AD (dementia of the Alzheimer type) do not show the generation effect. One study included 42 healthy adults, 23 with very mild AD, and 26 with mild AD. Researchers Kristi S. Multhaup and David A. Balota had participants read some sentences (e.g., "The horse jumped the fence.") and generate the endings to other sentences (e.g., "The gentleman opened the"). Later, participants were given the subjects of the sentences (e.g., "horse"; "gentleman") and asked to recall the object that had been paired with the words in the previous sentences (e.g., "fence"; "door"). Healthy older adults showed higher recall for words that they had generated compared with 383 words that they had read (i.e., a significant generation effect). In contrast, individuals diagnosed with DAT did not show a difference in recall for words that they had generated and words that they had read. Similarly, another study reported four experiments with the same group of 18 DAT individuals and found little evidence for a generation effect in word recall, word recognition, or recall of action instructions.

== See also ==
- List of memory biases
