= Social comparison bias =

Cognitive bias

Social comparison bias refers to the tendency to feel dislike or competitiveness toward someone who is perceived as physically, socially, or mentally superior. Closely related is social comparison theory, which suggests that people evaluate their own worth by comparing themselves to others. This theory was introduced in 1954 by psychologist Leon Festinger. Social comparison is considered central to factors such as achievement motivation, perceptions of injustice, depression, jealousy, and even the willingness to stay in relationships or jobs. The core idea is that individuals strive to achieve the best possible outcome relative to their peers. For example, a person may compare the affordable department stores they usually visit with the designer boutiques frequented by their peers. Such comparisons can trigger feelings of resentment, anger, and envy. This bias primarily revolves around wealth and social status. It tends to occur unconsciously, with most people unaware that they are making such judgments. Typically, individuals compare themselves with members of their peer group or with those they perceive as similar.

== Research ==
There are many studies focusing on social comparison and its effects on mental health. One such study examined the relationship between depression and social comparison. Thwaites and Dagnan, in "Moderating variables in the relationship between social comparison and depression", investigated this relationship using an evolutionary framework. They hypothesized that depression could result from the social comparisons people make. This study explored the moderating effects of two factors: the personal importance of the comparison dimensions, and the perceived importance of those dimensions to other people. To measure depression in participants, the researchers used a self-esteem test called the Self Attributes Questionnaire, developed by Pelham and Swann in 1989. The test included 10-point Likert scale ratings across ten individual social comparison dimensions (e.g. intelligence, social skills, sense of humor). Additional questions were added to examine beliefs about the importance of these dimensions. Data were collected from a combined clinical and non-clinical sample of 174 individuals. They concluded, based on the data, that social comparison was indeed related to depression. Participants who engaged more frequently in social comparison reported higher levels of depression than those who did so less often. Research has also shown that there are two forms of social comparison. Upward comparison occurs when individuals compare themselves to those who appear better off or superior. In contrast, downward comparison occurs when individuals compare themselves to those who are worse off, often fostering a competitive attitude.

== Cognitive effects ==
One major symptom that can occur with social comparison bias is the mental disorder of depression. Depression is typically diagnosed during a clinical evaluation using the Diagnostic and Statistical Manual of Mental Disorders, Fourth Edition (DSM-IV) criteria. Symptoms include depressed mood, hopelessness, and sleep difficulties, including both hypersomnia and insomnia. Clinical depression can be caused by various factors in a person's life. Major depressive disorder is a common mental illness associated with social comparison bias. Depression also has a biological explanation for why people lose hope in life. It is linked to a reduction in the size of the hippocampus and decreased levels of serotonin circulating in the brain. Another negative symptom associated with social comparison bias is suicide ideation. Suicidal ideation is defined as persistent thoughts of suicide and suicide attempts. It can arise from social comparison bias because individuals who compare themselves to those perceived as superior may feel mentally discouraged, believing they cannot achieve or appear in the same way, which leads to low self-esteem. Low self-esteem is one of the main factors contributing to suicidal ideation.

Additionally, social comparison bias can increase feelings of anxiety. This anxiety may stem from various concerns, such as one's progress in life. It can manifest as nervousness about logging on to social media and viewing posts, which may then develop into social anxiety when encountering those same individuals offline. This can act as a potential trigger. Specifically, regarding anxiety and body image, people may be easily triggered while using social media. "A common problem with social media is the tendency for people to compare themselves to others. Social media is a place where people tend to tailor their image to present only positive aspects. When others share stories or images of success, achievement, beauty, love, or happiness, it can trigger feelings of inferiority."

== Physical/Behavioral Effects ==
Social comparison can lead some individuals to engage in harmful behaviors as a coping mechanism. These may include, but are not limited to, drug/substance abuse, self-harm (such as cutting), eating disorders (especially anorexia nervosa and bulimia nervosa), alcoholism, and other unhealthy strategies.

When it comes to social media, social comparison can also play a significant role. Individuals may take steps such as unfollowing accounts or pages that they find triggering. Conversely, it can be beneficial to follow more positive and inspiring accounts. Taking breaks from social media has also been shown to be helpful.

== In the media ==
Mainstream media is also a major contributor to social comparisons. Taking beauty as an example, advertisements everywhere try to show the public what beauty should look like. Magazines, commercials, and billboards all depict the ideal appearance of beauty. When a growing generation of youth and adults are exposed to this, they tend to compare themselves to the images they see all around them. If they do not look a certain way or have a specific weight, society often criticizes them for it. This can lead to low self-esteem and even trigger depression because they do not fit the societal standard of beauty. People are judged when they do not resemble the models in magazines or on TV. Comparing oneself to media figures can have harmful effects, causing mental anxiety, stress, negative body image, and eating disorders. Given that media plays such a central role in modern Western culture, low self-esteem and a negative self-perception can have serious societal consequences, including suicide and self-harm. Social comparison can make people lose confidence and feel pressured to meet society's expectations of perfection. In an experiment studying women's body image after comparing themselves to different types of models, body image was significantly more negative after viewing images of thin models compared to viewing images of average-size or plus-size models. Media is one of the leading contributors to negative body image among both youth and adults due to social comparison.

=== Through social media ===
Social media being a main source of news and breaking news stories can help people connect and learn in new ways. It is easier to see people's private life on a public network. Social networks such as Facebook makes viewing someone's daily life as simple as sending a request. Society is exposed to everyone's lives and people are starting to compare themselves with their friends that they have on Facebook. It is easy to log in and see someone brag about their success or their new belongings and feel bad about themselves. In recent studies, researchers have been linking Facebook with depression in this generation of social media. They may start to have low self-esteem by seeing their friends online have more exciting lives and more popularity. This social comparison bias among social network users online can make people start to think of their lives as not as fulfilling as they want to be. They see pictures or statuses about job promotions or new jobs, vacations; new relationships, fun outings, or even those that can afford nice things. This can cognitively affect people's self-esteem and is recognized as a possible factor in depressive disorders. They can start to feel bad about their appearance and their life in general. Social media influences the number of social comparisons people have. One study found that the more time users spend on Facebook each week, the more likely they are to think that others were happier and having better lives than themselves.

== In the school system ==
Social comparisons are also relevant in the school system. Students depending on their grade level can be competitive about the grades they receive compared to their peers. Social comparisons not only influence students' self-concepts but also improve their performance. This social comparison process leads to a lower self-concept when the class level is high and to a higher self-concept when the class level is low. Therefore, two students with equal performance in a domain may develop different self-concepts when they belong to different classes with different performance levels. Social comparisons are important and valid predictors of students' self-evaluations and achievement behavior. Students may feel jealousy or competitiveness when it comes to grades and getting into better colleges and universities than their peers. Social comparison can also motivate students to do well because they want to keep along with their peers.

== Conclusion ==
Social comparison bias can occur in people's everyday life. Whether it is on social networking sites, in the media, in society regarding wealth and social status, or in the school system, it can be harmful to one's mental health due to the increasing risks of depression, suicidal ideation, and other mental disorders. Social comparison in this generation is everywhere and society revolves around comparing themselves to one another if it is to have a higher self-esteem or to try and better themselves as a whole. With this importance, it will lead to social comparison bias and cause negative effects on a person's life. Based on the research found, the hypothesis was proven correct stating that depression does have a relationship with the social comparison that people in society participate in.

== See also ==
- Social comparison theory
- Instagram's impact on people
- List of cognitive biases
