= Denomination effect =

Form of cognitive bias relating to currency

The denomination effect is a form of cognitive bias relating to currency, suggesting people may be less likely to spend larger currency denominations than their equivalent value in smaller denominations. It was proposed by Priya Raghubir, professor at the New York University Stern School of Business, and Joydeep Srivastava, professor at University of Maryland, in their 2009 paper "Denomination Effect".

Raghubir and Srivastava conducted three studies in their research on the denomination effect; their findings suggested people may be more likely to spend money represented by smaller denominations and that consumers may prefer to receive money in a large denomination when there is a need to control spending. The denomination effect can occur when large denominations are perceived as less exchangeable than smaller denominations.

The effect's influence on spending decisions has implications throughout various sectors in society, including consumer welfare, monetary policy and the finance industry. For example, during the Great Recession, one businessman observed employees using more coins rather than banknotes in an office vending machine, perceiving the customers used coins to feel thriftier. Raghubir and Srivastava also suggested the effect may involve incentives to alter future behavior and that a large denomination can serve as a mechanism to prevent the urge to spend.

== Raghubir and Srivastava experiment ==
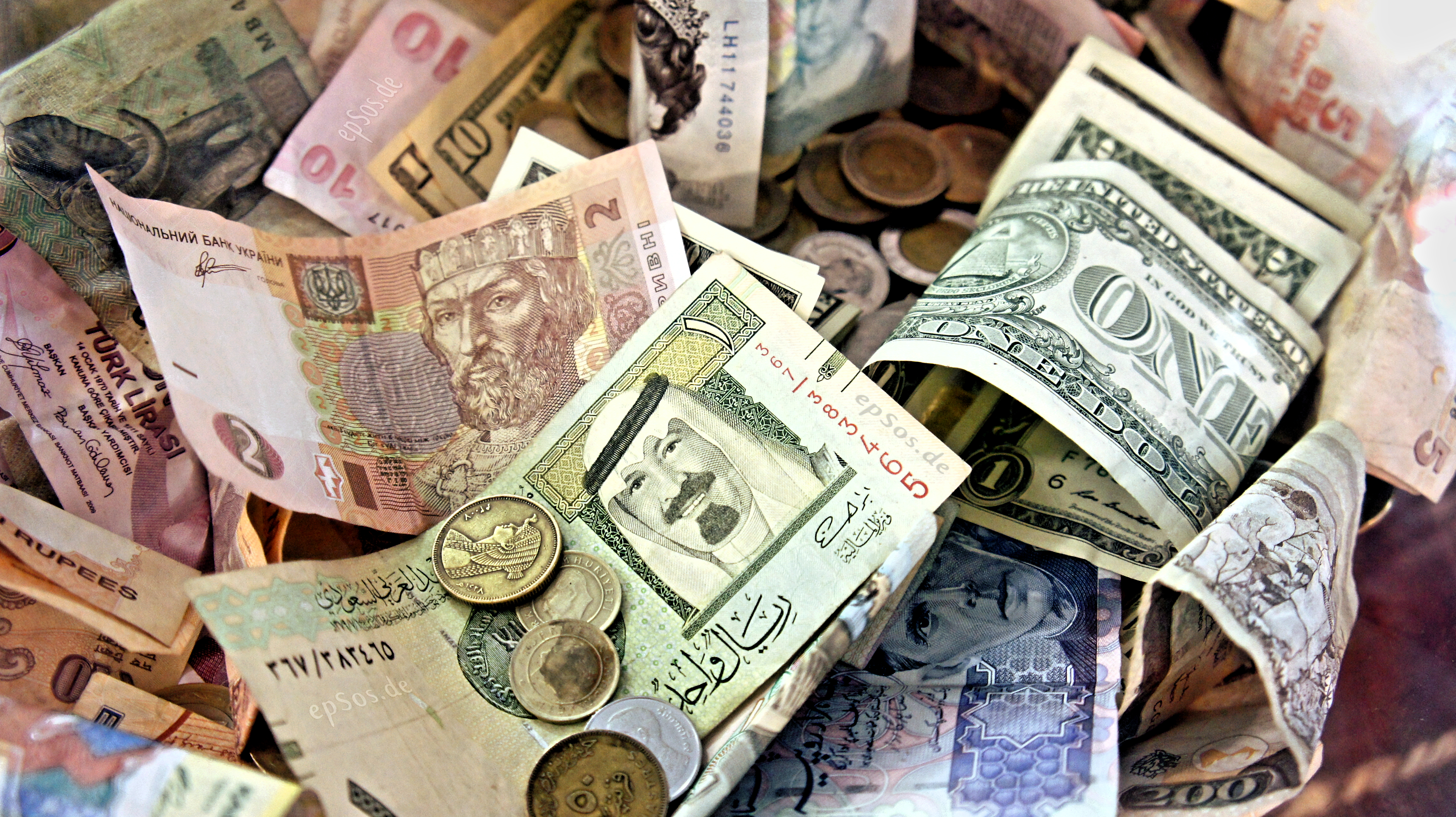
The denomination effect influences spending decisions.

Raghubir and Srivastava conducted three distinct studies as part of their experiment. Their first experiment involved 89 undergraduate students from two United States universities. As a cover story, the students were thanked for their participation and randomly given either a small denomination (four quarters) or a large denomination ($1 bill) and told they could keep or spend the money on confectionery. Small denominations were given to 43 students (48% of study group) and 46 students (52% of study group) were given large denominations. Approximately 44% (39/89) of the participants, in both conditions, chose to purchase confectionery. About 63% of the participants with the four quarters purchased candy, yet only 26% of the participants with the $1 bill spent money, suggesting the students were more inclined to spend when given a smaller denomination.

In a second study, 75 gas-station customers were each asked to participate in a short survey on gas usage. Each participant was given $5 as either five $1 bills, five $1 coins or one $5 bill and told they could spend the money at the gas station store. Customers who were given five $1 bills were more likely to buy something compared to customers receiving a single $5 bill. Customers who received five $1 coins had the lowest likelihood of spending, however the currency is in low-circulation and some are retained as souvenirs.

A third study sought to understand whether the effect was particular to American culture. In China, 150 housewives were given an envelope of money in exchange for completing a survey, containing either a single Renminbi (CNY) 100 banknote or five banknotes of equivalent value (in 2009, CNY 100 was equivalent to roughly $14.63 USD or €10.40 EUR). The cash represented a significant amount of money based on the monthly income of the participants, as 18.7% (28/150) earned less than CNY 300, 65% earned (97/150) between CNY 301 and 600 and 16.7% (25/150) earned over CNY 600. The average household size was about 3.3 people in both conditions. Some who purchased household items were less satisfied if they had received a large banknote, compared to the others who felt more satisfied spending smaller denominations.

== Early studies ==
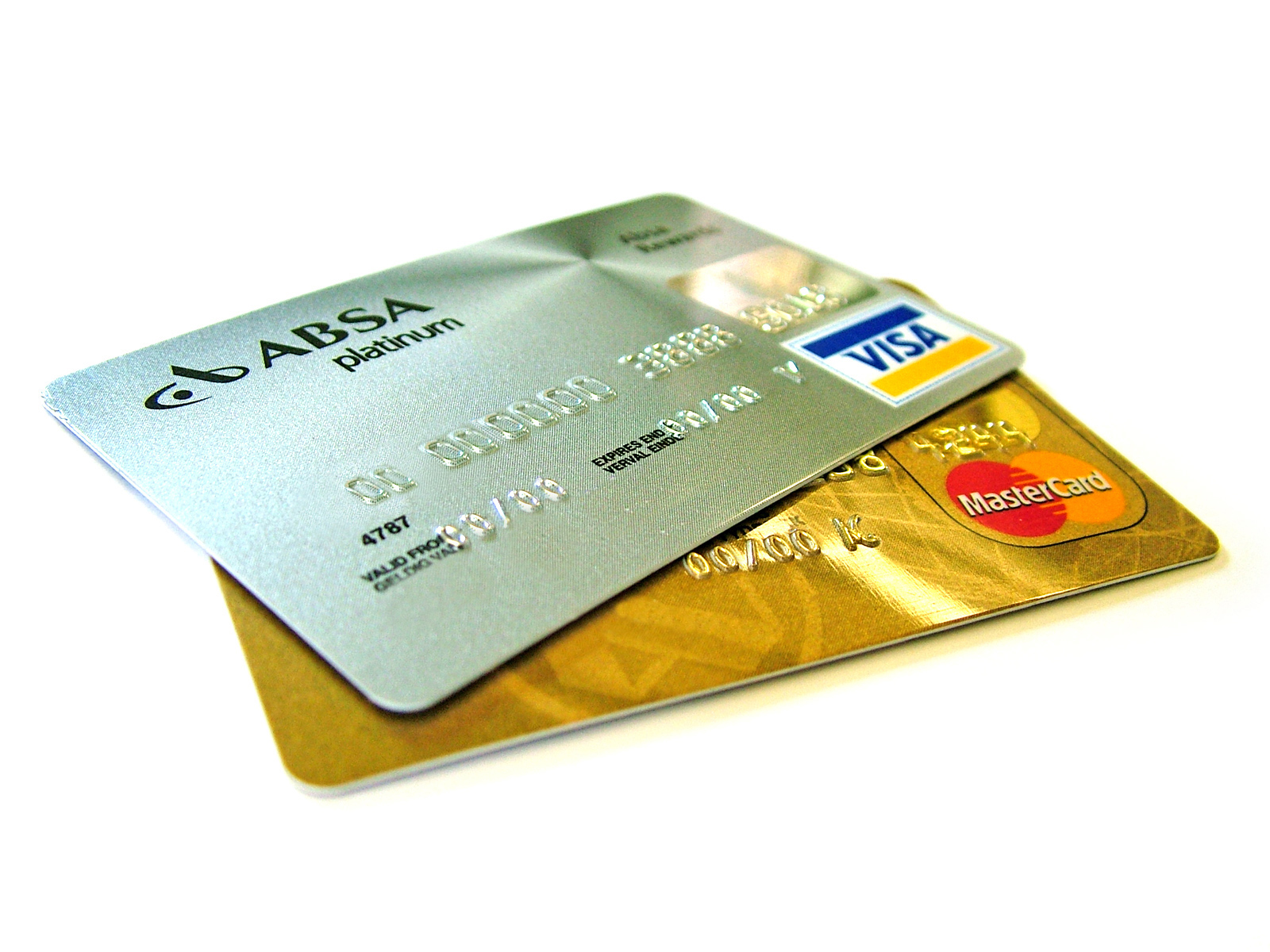
Alternate payment methods

One study, conducted by marketing professors Arul Mishra, Himanshu Mishra and Dhananjay Nayakankuppam in 2006, documented a phenomenon whereby consumers spent less of a large denomination, but not with smaller denominations. In the study, they concluded that people give higher value to a large single denomination because it is more difficult to process the transaction, leading people to overvalue it and make them less likely to spend compared to an identical amount in smaller denominations. Unlike Mishra et al., who studied purchase intentions, Raghubir and Srivastava examined actual purchase decisions.

Previous research by Raghubir and Srivastava in 2008 found a higher inclination to spend using alternative payment methods, such as a credit or gift cards. Their experiment built on earlier research studies, including one by Harvard business professor John Gourville in 1998, which showed that people are more likely to analyze a transaction positively when the same amount of money is presented as an equally distributed sum each day instead of a single lump sum each year.

== Conclusions ==
Raghubir and Srivastava concluded in study 1 that people are more likely to spend when an equivalent amount of money is represented by a smaller denomination relative to a single large denomination. In study 2, they concluded that consumers prefer to receive money in a large denomination compared to small denominations when there is a need to control spending. Study 3 further proves that the denomination effect depends on an individual's desire to reduce the uneasy feeling associated with spending money. The denomination effect occurs because people perceive a large denomination as less replaceable than smaller denominations, which can be used to control and regulate spending.

In 2009, Sean Gregory with Time magazine explained that consumers view large denominations as more valuable than smaller denominations and that they tend to isolate the cash in their minds. Each smaller denomination $20 bill, he noted, is a less valuable entity than the single large denomination $100 bill. It's easier to spend five $20 bills than it is to spend a single $100 bill. Gregory also added that consumers fear breaking a single large denomination because they won't be able to stop spending the change.

The researchers suggested that the denomination effect may involve imposing self-constraints or incentives to alter future behavior, noting a large denomination can serve as a precommitment mechanism to prevent the urge to spend compared to small denominations.

== Applications ==
Raghubir and Srivastava believe the influence of denomination on spending decisions has implications on consumer welfare and monetary policy. Raghubir suggested offering smaller denominations to encourage spending and proposed increasing circulation of $1 coins and introduce $2 coins in the United States.

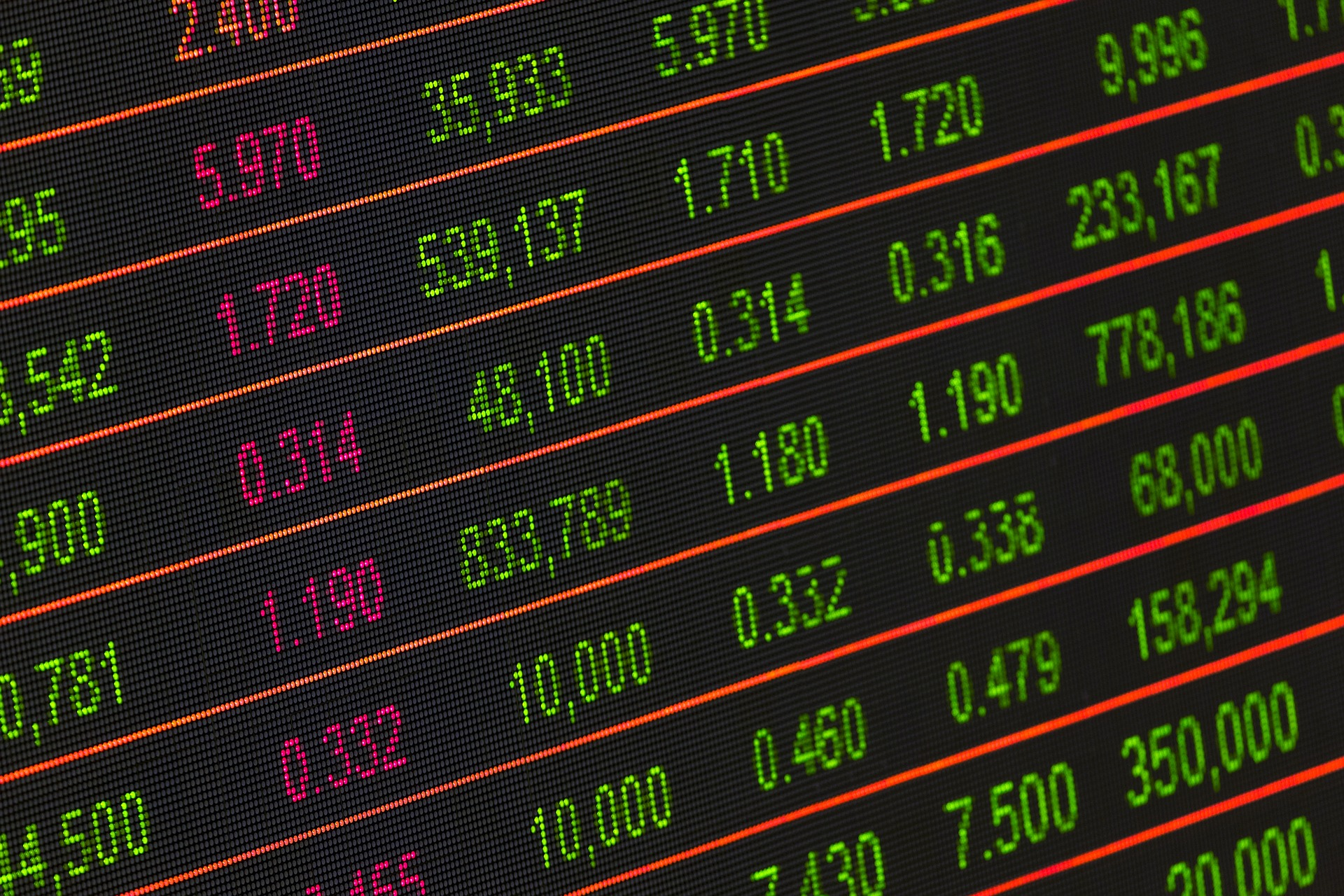
The denomination effect has implications in buying and selling stocks.

In 2012, Gary Belsky and Tom Gilovich of Time magazine stated that Raghubir and Srivastava's results were consistent with what they called mental accounting, suggesting small denomination banknotes tend to get assigned to a "mental petty cash account" to spend on trivial things. In contrast, larger denomination banknotes are perceived as "real money" and likely to spend on things of greater importance.

A 2009 National Public Radio report noted that as the recession worsened, a Sacramento businessman noticed that people were using more coins, rather than banknotes, in his office vending machine. The businessman believed the consumers were feeling economic hardship and that using coins instead of banknotes made them feel thriftier.

John Manning, columnist at the International Banker, noted the effect surfaces in the finance field, when an asset's unit of value exposes an investor's tendency to spend less when given in larger amounts. Manning cited the example of a stock split, suggesting the number of shares is increased by a certain ratio and diminished in price by the same factor, so that the company's total equity value remains the same. Stock splits are done largely because of the denomination effect, as the belief is that a less expensive share price can increase stock demand.

== See also ==
- Availability heuristic
- Mean reversion (finance)
- Money illusion
- Oscar's grind
