= Leverage-point modeling =

Leverage-point modeling (LPM) is a demonstrated approach for improved planning and spending for operations and support (O&S) activities.

== See also ==
- Donella Meadows
- Twelve leverage points
