= Complexity, Problem Solving, and Sustainable Societies =

1996 economics paper by Joseph Tainter

"Complexity, Problem Solving, and Sustainable Societies" is a paper on energy economics by Joseph Tainter from 1996.

== Focus ==
It focuses on the energy cost of problem solving, and the energy-complexity relation in manmade systems. This is a mirror of the negentropic tendencies of natural evolution, according to ecological economics, notably the arguments of Donella Meadows and her colleagues on the economic constraints of contemporary problem solving.

The Limits to Growth, 1972, argued that "to raise world food production from 1951-1966 by 34%, for example, required increasing expenditures on tractors of 63%, on nitrate fertilizers of 146%, and on pesticides of 300%. To remove all organic wastes from a sugar-processing plant costs 100 times more than removing 30%. To reduce sulfur dioxide in the air of a U.S. city by 9.6 times, or particulates by 3.1 times, raises the cost of pollution control by 520 times." All environmental problem solving will face constraints of this kind, Tainter argues. It is not a question of expending a lot of energy to discover "more efficient" ways to do these things - that process amplifies the decline.

=== Attempts ===
Attempts to impose the "most efficient" means have other problems. In The Rise and Decline of Nations, Mancur Olson argues that "bureaucratic regulation itself generates further complexity and costs. As regulations are issued and taxes established, those who are regulated or taxed seek loopholes and lawmakers strive to close these. A competitive spiral of loophole discovery and closure unfolds, with complexity continuously increasing."

"In these days when the cost of government lacks political support," Tainter argues, "such a strategy is unsustainable. It is often suggested that environmentally benign behavior should be elicited through taxation incentives rather than through regulations. While this approach has some advantages, it does not address the problem of complexity, and may not reduce overall regulatory costs as much as is thought. Those costs may only be shifted to the taxation authorities, and to the society as a whole.

It is not that research, education, regulation, and new technologies cannot potentially alleviate our problems. With enough investment perhaps they can. The difficulty is that these investments will be costly, and may require an increasing share of each nation's gross domestic product. With diminishing returns to problem solving, addressing environmental issues in our conventional way means that more resources will have to be allocated to science, engineering, and government. In the absence of high economic growth this would require at least a temporary decline in the standard of living, as people would have comparatively less to spend on food, housing, clothing, medical care, transportation, and entertainment."

"To circumvent costliness in problem solving it is often suggested that we use resources more intelligently and efficiently," Tainter continues, but cites Timothy F. H. Allen and Thomas Hoekstra, 1992, as claiming that "in managing ecosystems for sustainability, managers should identify what is missing from natural regulatory process and provide only that. The ecosystem will do the rest. Let the ecosystem (i.e., solar energy) subsidize the management effort rather than the other way around." This was later to be a cornerstone of the economic strategy of natural capitalism.

=== Requirement of knowledge ===
Tainter argues that this would "require much knowledge that we do not now possess. That means we need research that is complex and costly, and requires fossil fuel subsidies. Lowering the costs of complexity in one sphere causes them to rise in another."

"Industrialism illustrates this point. It generated its own problems of complexity and costliness. These included railways and canals to distribute coal and manufactured goods, the development of an economy increasingly based on money and wages, and the development of new technologies. While such elements of complexity are usually thought to facilitate economic growth, in fact they can do so only when subsidized by energy." (italics ours).

This is the central argument Tainter makes: the energy economy always subsidizes the product economy and service economy, and any intermediates such as wholesale markets. Without looking at energy costs at every trophic level, and the transfer between, which appears to be decreasing as more technology is applied, there is simply no way to discover what is and is not "efficient".

"With subsidies of inexpensive fossil fuels, for a long time many consequences of industrialism effectively did not matter. Industrial societies could afford them. When energy costs are met easily and painlessly, benefit/cost ratio to social investments can be substantially ignored (as it has been in contemporary industrial agriculture). Fossil fuels made industrialism, and all that flowed from it (such as science, transportation, medicine, employment, consumerism, high-technology war, and contemporary political organization), a system of problem solving that was sustainable for several generations."

"Energy has always been the basis of cultural complexity and it always will be."

Tainter concludes that considerable hardship will be required to adjust to an economy that is (a) smaller (b) reliant more on individuals to carry out their own primary production, say in gardens and farms (c) not investing in problem solving to a greater extent than is warranted by the actual savings in energy that result out the other end.

== See also ==
- Twelve leverage points - Twelve leverage points to intervene in a system were proposed by Donella Meadows
- Morphological analysis
