= Bizarreness effect =

Idea that bizarre things are more memorable

Bizarreness effect is the proposed tendency of bizarre material to be better remembered than common material. The effect does not occur in all contexts, and the set of all material must vary in bizarreness for it to emerge. Some scientific research suggests it does not exist, or that it in fact worsens recollection.

== Causes ==
McDaniel and Einstein argue that bizarreness intrinsically does not enhance memory in their paper from 1986. They claim that bizarre information becomes distinctive. It is the distinctiveness that according to them makes encoding easier.

== See also ==
- Flashbulb memory
- Mnemonic aid
- Von Restorff effect
