= Hedwig von Restorff =

German psychologist

- Born: 14 December 1906; Berlin
- Died: July 6, 1962 (aged 55); Freiburg im Breisgau
- Occupation: Psychologist
- Known for: von Restorff effect

Hedwig von Restorff (14 December 1906 – 6 July 1962) was a German psychologist known for her discovery of the isolation effect that bears her name.

== Early life and education ==
Hedwig von Restorff was born on 14 December 1906 in Berlin.

Von Restorff attended the University of Berlin where she also earned her PhD. She studied and practiced psychology according to Gestalt traditions. During her psychological career, von Restorff worked at the University of Berlin as a postdoctoral assistant to Wolfgang Köhler. During that time, she published two papers. The first touched on her findings of the isolation paradigm experiments ran in 1933, while the second was co-authored with Köhler. Her writings have never been published in English which has caused some work to be lost due to secondary accounts.

== Isolation paradigm ==
The isolation paradigm refers to a distinctive feature of an item in a list that differs from the others by way of dimension. Von Restorff was not the first to use the isolation paradigm in a study. Researchers before her used the isolation paradigm to observe the effect of vividness on memory. However, following her studies, the term isolation paradigm became associated with von Restorff and the study of distinctiveness. The use of the isolation paradigm proves useful in lists that differ among shape, color, the use of numbers and letters, and orientation. Often the effect has been linked to attention. The distinctive feature separates the item from the others on the list, thus better capturing the participant's attention.

== 1933 experiments ==
Hedwig von Restorff used the isolation paradigm in the experiments included in her 1933 paper. Her use of the isolation paradigm was to further investigate interference effects. Despite criticism towards the use of nonsense syllables growing in the psychological society at this time, von Restorff dedicated the first page of her published paper to defending her choice in the usage of them. Over her study, von Restorff presented her participants with three lists of items over a span of three days. On the first day, the items on the list were all unrelated and consisted of five different types of materials, ending with eight pairs total. Half of the pairs consisted of nonsense syllables (homogeneous pairs), while the other half represented the other four types of materials (numbers, words, letters, symbols). On the next two days, participants were given lists that contained an isolated item among homogeneous items. The isolated item occurred in either the second or third position on the list. Participants were given specific memory instructions and tested on their recall of the items they were shown.

== Results of von Restorff's studies ==
Participants obtained better recall of the isolated materials on the list than they did the homogeneous items. When an isolated item appeared earlier in the list of items, perceptual salience, or information that is the focus on one's attention, was not necessary for creating the isolation effect. Overall, what the von Restorff experiments found was that the isolation of an item in a list against the homogeneous pairs improves the learning of that isolated item. Von Restorff's findings suggest that for the isolation effect to occur, focused attention on the different or isolated item is necessary. The differentiated attention comes from either the perceptual salience or contextual difference of the isolated item.

== Legacy ==
The effect of distinctiveness on memory is a topic that researchers have continued to study. The substantial contribution that von Restorff made to the theory of the isolation effect can still be seen today. It influenced a number of studies expanding on the topic that continue even today. Different perspectives on the von Restorff effect have stemmed from her work, such as Hunt and Lamb focusing on the balance of the listed items instead of the isolate. A study by Karis, Fabiani and Donchin explored the amount of items recalled based upon whether the participant recalled isolated items or not. They found that the more isolated items a participant recalled, the more overall items they recalled.

Hedwig von Restorff is a rare instance among psychologists to have discovered an effect and have it named after them, the most known likely being the Stroup effect, which is also an effect impacting memory. The fact that von Restorff was a woman adds further to the uniqueness of this eponym.

The research on the isolation effect has not finished in the 20th century, being examined in the 2020s in neuroimaging study, using the fMRI. The von Restorff effects holds importance in research of cognitive sciences, psychology to this day.

In 1984, a scientific article by Karis, Fabiani, and Donchin gained significant attention, examining individual differences in the impact of von Restorff effect, receiving over 600 scientific citations. Earlier studies by R. Reed Hunt of the University of Texas at San Antonio or W.P. Wallace provide good overview, gaining attention of around 450 citations each since their publishing.

In 2025, an article online by Roberto Lisandro from the Medium website describes and explains how to apply the findings related to the memory effect during creation of graphic design. The Laws of UX website includes von Restorff effect among "best practices that designers can consider when building user interfaces".
