= Euphoric recall =

Concept in psychology

Euphoric recall is a cognitive bias that describes the tendency of people to remember past experiences in a positive light, while overlooking negative experiences associated with some event(s). Euphoric recall has primarily been cited as a factor in substance dependence. Individuals may become obsessed with recreating the remembered pleasures of the past, where positive expectancy of outcomes results in the belief that substance use can provide immediate relief.

Within the context of substance dependence, euphoric recall frequently emerges as a disruptive factor in addiction recovery. Initiation of recovery is argued to be a direct result of loss of pleasure in an addict's life, which is a form of "psychic numbness". However, it has been suggested that euphoric recall has the ability to override the "numbness" felt during recovery, therefore causing potential relapses in addiction.

== Theoretical framework ==
The theoretical framework of euphoric recall is rooted within the expectancy theory of the cognitive-behavioural model of addiction, which explains how our beliefs about the expectations of drug use influence cognitive, social, and behavioural impacts. According to the model, these beliefs can be either positive or negative and are related to the specific substance being used. Euphoric recall is a cognitive distortion that emerges when an individual engages in positive expectancies, where memories recollected during drug usage are only pleasant and trouble-free, and individuals face denial about the true nature of their situation; this is a common symptom of substance abuse.

== Mechanisms and motivations ==
Euphoric recall is proposed to stem from associative learning mechanisms, where substance usage functions as a positive reinforcer, inducing a state of euphoria. The operant conditioning process links drug usage with positive expectancies, resulting in positive reinforcement. Consequently, during euphoric recall, individuals are driven by the desire for pleasure and excitement, propelled by the euphoric effects of substance use that may alter memory perception. This distortion occurs as individuals often rely on their most vivid memories or knowledge about typical outcomes; consequently, the memory of substance usage tends to be biased and selective, contributing to euphoric recall. As a result, there is a strong compulsion for individuals to crave drugs as they become associated with feelings of happiness and positive memories.

A diagram explaining the operant conditioning process.

As stated, euphoric recall develops as a product of a conditioning process. This conditioning process operates via stimulus-reward and stimulus-action learning mechanisms, wherein particular contexts become linked with specific responses. For instance, drug-related cues may evoke a desire for the euphoric reward associated with drug consumption. The development of euphoric recall begins during early and highly rewarding drug use. Various external and internal cues are associated with positive drug experiences and "fantasies" that did not occur but were imagined based on the context of the experience. This occurs because memory plays a critical role in forming associations between intrinsic drug rewards for positive experiences and other coincidental rewards, such as sociability and confidence. These coincidental rewards are known as "fantasies", encompassing positive memories from previous experiences and episodic fantasies about future ones. As a result, with prolonged drug use, there is a combined retrieval of expected and actual events regarding substance consumption, leading to euphoric recall.

== Potential treatment ==
=== Cognitive-behavioural interventions ===
Cognitive-behavioural interventions are based on the cognitive model that people's emotions and behaviours are a direct result of how external and internal events are perceived. These interventions are commonly utilised in addiction treatment, where structured techniques are employed to aid in the identification of negative thought patterns that are associated with euphoric recall. Among these interventions, Cognitive restructuring in particular can be useful in overcoming euphoric recall, since it is often used when assumptions or expectations are false or irrational. This involves individuals critically examining and altering perceptions of their previous experiences with substance use; altering positive perceptions to become more realistic using rational evidence can help prevent euphoric recall when individuals come into contact with potential triggers. Cognitive restructuring therefore helps individuals recognise their "automatic thoughts" that often arise without conscious awareness or reasoning. This recognition enables clinical intervention to target the underlying thought processes that lead to euphoric recall, rather than merely addressing the consequences that stem from it.

While cognitive restructuring can significantly aid recovery, there are potential drawbacks. For instance, cognitive restructuring may require a high level of cognitive functioning and insight, which could be challenging for individuals with cognitive deficits or limited awareness of their addictive behaviours. Additionally, while cognitive restructuring can help alter perceptions of past substance use experiences, it may not fully address the underlying psychological issues or traumas driving the desire for euphoric recall. As such, while cognitive-behavioural interventions have their benefits, they may need to be supplemented with other therapeutic approaches, such as mindfulness, to provide comprehensive and individualised treatment for euphoric recall within addiction recovery programs.

=== Mindfulness ===
Mindfulness-based interventions, including mindfulness meditation and acceptance and commitment therapy (ACT), offer individuals a comprehensive approach to effectively manage euphoric recall and cravings associated with it. Grounded in the principles of mindfulness, these interventions emphasise cultivating present-moment awareness and fostering non-judgmental acceptance of internal experiences, including craving-related thoughts and emotions. For instance, through ACT, individuals learn to observe their cravings during euphoric recall with compassion, rather than attempting to suppress them or reacting impulsively by participating in substance use. By adopting a mindful stance towards their cravings, individuals can disengage from automatic patterns of behaviour and thought, thereby gaining greater cognitive flexibility and emotional regulation skills. This enhanced capacity for self-regulation enables individuals to respond to euphoric recall in a more adaptive manner, without succumbing to the urge to engage in substance use or addictive behaviours.

While mindfulness-based interventions are effective in treating the effects of euphoric recall, they may require a significant time investment and regular practice to yield noticeable benefits. This could pose challenges for individuals with limited motivation or adherence to treatment. Additionally, while mindfulness encourages non-judgmental acceptance of internal experiences, including craving-related thoughts and emotions from euphoric recall, some individuals may find it difficult to adopt this, particularly if they have deeply ingrained patterns of self-criticism or resistance to accepting uncomfortable feelings. Similarly to cognitive-behavioural interventions, mindfulness should be used with other therapeutic interventions for the best results.

== See also ==
- Rosy retrospection
- Confirmation bias
