= Intentionality bias =

Belief that all human behaviour is intentional

Intentionality bias, which is known as intention bias for short, is a bias that makes people believe that all human behavior is intentional and that unconscious and/or accidental behavior is less likely behavior. This cognitive bias can happen even if the evidence against the assumption is presented to the person. This tendency has extensive ramifications for societal dynamics, interpersonal relationships, as well as conflict resolution. Intentionality bias may result in misjudgment of people's behavior, misunderstanding as well as miscommunication. This tendency may contribute to unfavorable prejudices and stereotypes, escalate conflicts and stigmatize people.
