= Puritanical bias =

Puritanical bias refers to the tendency to attribute cause of an undesirable outcome or wrongdoing by an individual to a moral deficiency or lack of self control rather than taking into account the impact of broader societal determinants. An example might be, "These people sit around all day in their apartments on welfare watching TV, but won't take the time to get out and find a job!" In this case, a selection of persons might have existed for some time under dire economic and/or socially oppressive circumstances, but individuals from that selection have been cognitively dis-empowered by these circumstances to decide or act on decisions to obtain a given goal.

== Relation to other biases ==
Puritanical bias is similar to correspondence bias - the tendency to infer dispositional characteristics from behaviours resulting entirely from situational factors - in that it relates to the consequences of over-emphasising dispositional factors over situational factors. Puritanical bias also mirrors a broader social psychology phenomenon: fundamental attribution error; that is the tendency for observers to under-emphasise the importance of situational determinants of a behaviour and to over-emphasise the importance of dispositional determinants. All above phenomena relate to the overweighting of dispositional rather than situational factors in explaining behaviour, and are thus related.

Where puritanical bias differentiates itself from the two is in specifically concerning only unpleasant and unwanted behaviours, by explaining them only through negative dispositional characteristics. It is entirely possible for correspondence bias and fundamental attribution error to emerge in the explanation of prosocial and desired behaviours. For example, one may attribute an individual donating to charity to their own selflessness and good will, while the behaviour would be more suitably explained by the vigour and efficacy with which the charity requests donations. This would be an example of fundamental attribution error, as situational factors have been under-emphasised in comparison to dispositional qualities in explaining a seemingly altruistic act. Further, while the moral nature of the behaviours with which correspondence bias concerns itself is unspecified, it is unique in that it only explains behaviours which result entirely from situational determinants. Both puritanical bias and fundamental attribution error are more flexible in their definitions in that they do not specify the degree to which the behaviour in question is determined by environment or disposition, just that in the explanation of the behaviour the dispositional explanations will be overemphasised and situational explanations underemphasised. Therefore, puritanical bias can be thought of as a more specific form of fundamental attribution error pertaining singularly to undesirable behaviours and undesirable dispositional characteristics.

== Explanations ==
Given its similarity to other cognitive biases, puritanical bias can be partially explained through existing explanations of fundamental attribution error and correspondence bias:

- Allostatic load: The allostatic load model details the damaging health effects of the hormonal mediators of stress, which can accelerate disease processes. This model relates to puritanical bias through the following processes: individuals in unfavourable environmental conditions will experience stress, which will go on to impact their health, thus creating a compounding effect which makes them increasingly stressed and thus increasingly susceptible to poor health, and so on and so forth. As allostatic load and stress accumulate over time, the initial situational stimuli which provoked the stress response become increasingly likely to have an effect on disposition. As a result, observers become increasingly prone to misinterpretation of an individual's undesirable conditions as a product of their disposition, rather than their situation.
- Culture: Individuals from individualistic societies have been shown experimentally to be more prone to fundamental attribution error than those from collectivist societies. Potential explanations for this phenomenon include individualists conceptualising other people as self-determining agents, leading to greater focus on individual variation (dispositional qualities) rather than contextual factors; or cognitive differences in information processing between individualistic and collectivistic individuals, with members of collectivist societies paying greater attention to contextual information than members of individualistic societies. Given the overlap between puritanical bias and fundamental attribution error as psychological phenomena (see above), it is reasonable to assume that their causes would overlap as well.
- Cognitive strain; There is research to indicate that fundamental attribution error (and thus puritanical bias) occurs at a greater frequency while individuals are under a cognitive load. This would indicate that puritanical bias occurs as a means of avoiding cognitive strain, as we characterise individuals through their behaviours automatically, but accounting for contextual factors which influence a behaviour demands greater cognitive effort.

== Criticisms ==
As the name implies, puritanical bias pertains to judgements about moralised and undesirable behaviours such as sexual promiscuity, obesity and alcoholism, which puritan morality condemns. Uhlman et al. (2010) investigated the susceptibility of white Americans to primes of Puritan-Protestant values regarding work and sex, as compared to British, Canadian and Asian-American participants, finding that white Americans were more likely to be implicitly influenced by Puritan-Protestant values regarding work and sex. This over-representation of Puritan moralistic value judgements in white American populations calls into question the universality of puritanical bias, as it is unclear whether the moral judgement of a behaviour precedes the explanation of an observed behaviour, or vice versa. Should the moral judgement occur first, then it is conceivable that puritanical bias emerges as a post-hoc rationalisation of our moral assessment of a behaviour, rather than the moral assessment arising from the factors which we assume to be causal of the observed behaviour. Should this be the case, then puritanical bias would occur with disproportionate frequency in white Americans who are implicitly more likely to make puritanical moral judgements of behaviours (see above). Therefore, puritanical bias would be an overwhelmingly American phenomenon.

== Importance ==
Some scholars have addressed the potential existence of puritanical bias in the existing social psychology literature. It is argued that by orienting paths of research around the assumption that self-control is always optimal, researchers imply that social issues such as obesity and under-saving for retirement are problems of individual-level low self-control, rather than contextual issues. George Loewenstein advises that the issue could potentially be remedied by more research into the perils of hyperopia, that is the effects of self-control regret, in order to balance perspectives on the importance of individual-level self-control as a determinant of behaviour.

Outside of academia, however, the issue of puritanical bias remains pertinent in shaping narratives surrounding social issues such as obesity, saving for retirement and violence against women. In disproportionately attributing individual-level explanations to undesirable outcomes, policy-makers absolve themselves of blame by displacing social issues onto those who suffer most from them.
