= Joseph Tainter =

American anthropologist and historian (born 1949)

Joseph Anthony Tainter (born December 8, 1949) is an American anthropologist and historian.

== Biography ==
Tainter studied anthropology at the University of California, Berkeley and Northwestern University, where he received his Ph.D. in 1975. As of 2012 he holds a professorship in the Department of Environment and Society at Utah State University. His previous positions include Project Leader of Cultural Heritage Research, Rocky Mountain Forest and Range Experiment Station, Albuquerque, New Mexico and assistant professor of anthropology at the University of New Mexico.

Tainter has written and edited many articles and monographs. His best-known work, The Collapse of Complex Societies (1988), examines the collapse of Maya and Chacoan civilizations, and of the Western Roman Empire, in terms of network theory, energy economics and complexity theory. Tainter argues that sustainability or collapse of societies follow from the success or failure of problem-solving institutions and that societies collapse when their investments in social complexity and their energy subsidies reach a point of diminishing marginal returns. He recognizes collapse when a society involuntarily sheds a significant portion of its complexity.

With Tadeusz Patzek, he is author of Drilling Down: The Gulf Oil Debacle and Our Energy Dilemma, published in 2011.

Joseph Tainter is married to Bonnie Bagley and they have one child, Emmet Bagley Tainter.

== Social complexity ==
As described in Tainter's Collapse of Complex Societies, societies become more complex as they try to solve problems. Social complexity can be recognized by numerous differentiated and specialised social and economic roles and many mechanisms through which they are coordinated, and by reliance on symbolic and abstract communication, and the existence of a class of information producers and analysts who are not involved in primary resource production. Such complexity requires a substantial "energy" subsidy, meaning the consumption of resources, or other forms of wealth.

When a society confronts a "problem," such as a shortage of energy, or difficulty in gaining access to it, it tends to create new layers of bureaucracy, infrastructure, or social class to address the challenge. Tainter, who first identifies seventeen examples of rapid collapse of societies, applies his model to three case studies: The Western Roman Empire, the Maya civilization, and the Chaco culture.

As Roman agricultural output slowly declined and population increased, per-capita energy availability dropped. The Romans "solved" this problem by conquering their neighbours to appropriate their energy surpluses, as metals, grain, slaves, other materials of value. As the Empire grew, the cost of maintaining communications, garrisons, civil government, etc. grew with it. Eventually, this cost grew so great that any new challenges such as invasions and crop failures could not be solved by the acquisition of more territory.

Intense, authoritarian efforts to maintain cohesion by Domitian and Constantine the Great only led to ever greater strain on the population. The empire was split in two, of which the western soon fragmented into smaller units. The eastern half, being wealthier, was able to survive longer, and did not collapse, but succumbed slowly and piecemeal, because unlike the western empire it had powerful neighbors able to take advantage of its weakness.

It is often assumed that the Decline of the Roman Empire in the west was a catastrophe for everyone involved. Tainter points out that it can be seen as a rational preference of individuals, many of whom were better off. Tainter notes that in the west, local populations in many cases greeted the barbarians as liberators.

== Diminishing returns ==
Tainter begins by categorizing the often inconsistent explanations that have been offered for collapse in the literature. In Tainter's view, while invasions, crop failures, disease or environmental degradation may be the apparent causes of societal collapse, the ultimate cause is an economic one, inherent in the structure of society rather than in external shocks which may batter them, diminishing returns on investments in social complexity. Tainter musters modern statistics to show that marginal returns on investments in energy (EROEI), education and technological innovation are diminishing today. The globalised modern world is subject to many of the same stresses that brought older societies to ruin.

Tainter is not entirely apocalyptic, "When some new input to an economic system is brought on line, whether a technical innovation or an energy subsidy, it will often have the potential at least temporarily to raise marginal productivity". Barring continual conquest of your neighbors, which is always subject to diminishing returns, innovation that increases productivity is – in the long run – the only way out of the dilemma of declining marginal returns on added investments in complexity.

In his final chapters, Tainter discusses why modern societies may not be able to choose to collapse, because surrounding them are other complex societies which will in some way absorb a collapsed region or prevent a general collapse. The Mayan and Chacoan regions had no powerful complex neighbors and so could collapse for centuries or millennia, as could the Western Roman Empire. The Eastern Roman Empire, bordered as it was by the Parthian/Sassanid Empire, did not have the option of devolving into simpler, smaller entities.

Tainter's concept of diminishing marginal returns on complexity, when applied to contemporary societies, has been termed Peak complexity. This term was coined by analogy to concepts such as Peak oil. It implies that "all societies and civilizations have natural limits to complexity and diversity" beyond which they are vulnerable to collapse. He later went on to work with others on a specific element of this process: the diminishing marginal returns on innovation.

His paper Complexity, Problem Solving, and Sustainable Societies (1996) focuses on the energy cost of problem solving, and the energy-complexity relation in man-made systems.

== Works ==
- Strumsky, Deborah; Lobo, José; Tainter, Joseph A. (2010–09). "Complexity and the productivity of innovation". Systems Research and Behavioral Science. 27 (5): 496–509. doi:10.1002/sres.1057. ISSN 1092-7026
- Tainter, Joseph (1988). The Collapse of Complex Societies. Cambridge University Press. ISBN 978-0-521-38673-9.
- Tainter, Joseph A.; Patzek, Tadeusz W. (18 September 2011). Drilling Down: The Gulf Oil Debacle and Our Energy Dilemma. Springer Science & Business Media. ISBN 978-1-4419-7677-2.

== See also ==
- Societal collapse
- Collapsology
- State collapse
- Wicked problem
