= Information flow (disambiguation) =

Information falow can have one of several meanings:

- Information flow, in discourse-based grammatical theory
  - Information Flow: The Logic of Distributed Systems an influential handbook ( ISBN 0-521-58386-1 ) by Jon Barwise and Jerry Seligman for the analysis of theories using its framework based on a melange of topics from information, model, and discourse theory which is applied to give a formalization of the logic of Quantum Mechanics.
- Information flow (information theory)
- Information cascade in network theory
  - Information flow diagram
- Communication
- Knowledge sharing
