= Subadditivity effect =

Cognitive bias

The subadditivity effect is the tendency to judge probability of the whole to be less than the probabilities of the parts.

== Example ==
For instance, subjects in one experiment judged the probability of death from cancer in the United States was 18%, the probability from heart attack was 22%, and the probability of death from "other natural causes" was 33%. Other participants judged the probability of death from a natural cause was 58%. Natural causes are made up of precisely cancer, heart attack, and "other natural causes," however, the sum of the latter three probabilities was 73%, and not 58%. According to Tversky and Koehler (1994) this kind of result is observed consistently.

== Explanations ==
In a 2012 article in Psychological Bulletin it is suggested the subadditivity effect can be explained by an information-theoretic generative mechanism that assumes a noisy conversion of objective evidence (observation) into subjective estimates (judgment). This explanation is different than support theory, proposed as an explanation by Tversky and Koehler, which requires additional assumptions. Since mental noise is a sufficient explanation that is much simpler and straightforward than any explanation involving heuristics or behavior, Occam's razor would argue in its favor as the underlying generative mechanism (it is the hypotheses which makes the fewest assumptions).
