= Boundary extension =

Common mistake of perception

Boundary extension (BE) is a cognitive psychology phenomenon and an error of commission in which people remember more of a scene or boundary than was originally present in the original picture. Boundary extension is typically studied using a recognition memory test where participants are shown a series of photos and then shown new photos that are either the same or have been altered in some way and asked if they are the same or different from the original photos. For example, people are typically presented with either a close-angle photo, which shows less of a picture scene, or a wide-angle photo, which shows more of a picture scene, during the study phase where the participant tries to memorize the picture and then a close or wide-angle photo during the test phase where the participant is tested on the original photos. Consequently, there are four different viewing conditions that people could experience the photos in: close-close, wide-wide, close-wide, or wide-close. If the participants respond that the new photos with more background are the same as the original photos, then they are demonstrating boundary extension because they are extending the boundary of the original photo.

How psychologists have studied boundary extension has evolved over time. For example, psychologists first studied this phenomenon by asking participants to draw scenes from memory. But after many studies, researchers moved to studying boundary extension through a picture recognition memory task which is the more widely used way to study boundary extension currently.

Boundary extension occurs with a variety of stimuli. For example, boundary extension happens with simple and complex photos, simple and complex objects, line-drawings, and photos and objects that have been zoomed in or out varying degrees. Multimodal boundary extension also happens with both the haptic and auditory senses. Boundary extension occurs with a variety of ages as well. For example, boundary extension is apparent very early in life in 3 to 4-month old infants and for children. College students are susceptible to boundary extension and so are older adults. Boundary extension even happens with people who have disorders such as Down syndrome.

Because boundary extension is so universal regarding different altered stimuli and age groups, there are many possible causes, examples, and scenarios of boundary extension. For example, people tend to draw entire scenes instead of what was just in the picture. Also, people naturally add more background into scenes regardless of whether they are just looking at the scene or drawing it. Essentially, what is just beyond the current boundaries becomes a part of the internal representation of the recalled scene in a person’s mind. In addition, many cognitive mechanisms influence boundary extension such as a source monitoring error and a perceptual schema.

== Vocabulary related to boundary extension ==
=== Source monitoring error ===
A source monitoring error can be defined as the inability to recall where information came from, especially when trying to recall the source of photos. For example, participants in boundary extension experiments often tend to say that the boundary-extended test photos came from the study pictures rather than recognizing that they altered the photos in their minds to cause boundary extension, and these new photos that they are trying to remember were self-generated.

=== Perceptual schema ===
A perceptual schema is a cognitive phenomenon and an internal mental representation of a scene that is created by oneself using prior knowledge and details of the world. Perceptual schemas often form when a person sees a new image because it can be a way to process the image using prior knowledge of other images that one has viewed and processed in the past. Perceptual schemas can form while the picture is being viewed for the first time or soon after. Perceptual schemas are applicable to boundary extension because one’s perceptual schema might add in background and boundary details that were not in the original photo but are a part of one’s perceptual schema of the photo.

=== Visual memory ===
Visual memory can be defined as the process by which one encodes and remembers visual information such as pictures. Visual memory is relevant to boundary extension because boundary extension is a visual memory phenomenon where one has to rely on the visual aspects of memory to try and recall pictures or notice any changes in the pictures or scenes.

== Possible causes of boundary extension ==
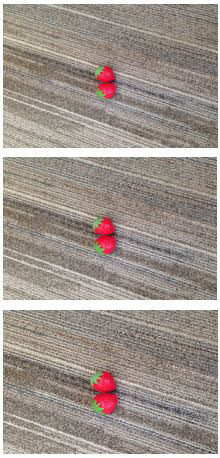
Simple BE photos with varying degrees of zoom

There are many possible causes of boundary extension. For example, source monitoring errors, perceptual schemas, and visual memory all partially can contribute to boundary extension because they are all related to how photos are initially processed and then later remembered.

A variety of types of objects and scenes also help facilitate boundary extension. For example, simple scenes, a picture with one main object, and complex scenes, a picture with more than one main object, cause people to boundary extend. Photos that are really similar and that have either been zoomed a large amount or a small amount also elicit boundary extension. Furthermore, wide-angled scenes, pictures that show more of the background, and close-angled scenes, pictures that show less of the background, contribute to the boundary extension phenomenon. These scenes can be of animals, landscapes, people, or other objects. Scenes with rotated objects of varying degrees also elicit boundary extension. Moreover, 3-D models of rooms with furniture are conducive to boundary extension compared with 2-D scenes. Even neutral and emotional photos help cause boundary extension. Boundary extension occurs for scene pictures, objects in pictures with blank backgrounds, and line drawings. Outline-scenes and outline-objects elicit boundary extension. So, a variety of different scene stimuli cause boundary extension for the average person.

== How boundary extension has evolved ==
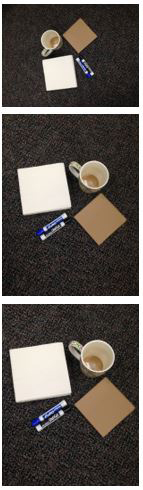
Complex BE photos with varying degrees of zoom

At first, boundary extension was studied by having participants draw scenes from memory. Participants would be presented with a photo and then the photo would be taken away and participants would be asked to draw the photo from memory keeping in mind the proportions of the original photo and the background. But because of the inherent tediousness and imprecision of coding and analyzing this kind of picture data, psychologists transitioned to studying boundary extension through picture recognition memory tasks. In a picture recognition memory task, participants would be shown photos in the study phase and then presented with photos that were the same or slightly altered in the test phase. They would be asked if the photo was the same or if the camera angle seemed a little further away, a lot further away, a little closer, or a lot closer. Finally, they would rate how confident they were about their answer ranging from sure, pretty sure, not sure, or did not see the picture.

== Boundary extension affects different age groups ==
Boundary extension occurs no matter what age one is. For example, boundary extension is present in infants. Children also have boundary extension no matter if they draw scenes from memory or complete a picture recognition task. Even college students have boundary extension no matter the kind of boundary extension task. Finally, adults and older adults demonstrate boundary extension tendencies as well. Boundary extension will persist and occur throughout one’s life starting in infancy.

== Multimodal boundary extension ==
=== Visual and haptic boundary extension ===
Boundary extension has been explored by incorporating a haptic element into a boundary extension task. The researchers had college students either view or touch 3-D scene-regions with a frame. The college students then recalled the stimuli that they had interacted with by listing what objects they had either felt or saw. Boundary extension occurred for both the visual and haptic stimuli and conditions. The researchers concluded that boundary extension occurs across modalities. People perceive and remember scenes multimodally through both their eyes and their hands.

=== Visual and auditory boundary extension ===
Boundary extension has also been studied by adding an auditory element to see how sound relates to boundary extension and picture memory. Researchers had participants complete the normal picture recognition memory task with an added auditory component. Participants were in one of three conditions: no sound, music, or sound effect. While viewing the photos in the study phase, participants either listened to silence, a sound relevant to the photo, or unrelated music. They then completed the normal test phase structure of the picture recognition memory task. Boundary extension occurred in all three conditions and did not differ across conditions. So, the type of noise did not affect boundary extension. Indeed, boundary extension in both auditory conditions was the same as the control condition where the participants listened to silence while viewing the photos. Auditory stimuli do not affect boundary extension at all.

== Boundary extension and different brains ==
=== Down syndrome ===
Children with Down syndrome still experienced boundary extension on the picture recognition memory task, the drawing task, and the 3-D scene memory task compared to children without Down syndrome despite the differences in their brains. Down syndrome participants typically demonstrated the most boundary extension on the drawing task.

=== Amnesia ===
Among test subjects with a type of brain damage that leads to a form of amnesia, the boundary extension error ranges from significantly less erroneous to nonexistent when compared to test subjects that do not have brain damage.
