= Next-in-line effect =

The next-in-line effect is the phenomenon of people being unable to recall information concerning events immediately preceding their turn to perform.

The effect was first studied experimentally by Malcolm Brenner in 1973. In his experiment the participants were each in turn reading a word aloud from an index card, and after 25 words were asked to recall as many of all the read words as possible. The results of the experiment showed that words read aloud within approximately nine seconds before the subject's own turn were recalled worse than other words.

The reason for the next-in-line effect appears to be a deficit in encoding the perceived information preceding a performance. That is, the information is never stored to long-term memory and thus cannot be retrieved later after the performance. One finding supporting this theory is that asking the subjects beforehand to pay more attention to events preceding their turn to perform can prevent the memory deficit and even result in overcompensation, making people remember the events before their turn better than others.

In addition, the appearance of the next-in-line effect does not seem to be connected to the level of fear of negative evaluation. Both people with lower and higher anxiety levels are subject to the memory deficit.
