= Von Restorff effect =

Theory that stimulus which differs the most from a group is remembered the most

The von Restorff effect, also known as the isolation effect, predicts that when multiple homogeneous stimuli are presented, the stimulus that differs from the rest is more likely to be remembered. The theory was coined by German psychiatrist and pediatrician Hedwig von Restorff (1906–1962), who, in her 1933 study, found that when participants were presented with a list of categorically similar items with one distinctive, isolated item on the list, memory for the item was improved.

The study utilized the isolation paradigm, which refers to a distinctive feature of an item in a list that differs from the others by way of dimension. Such distinctiveness, leading to the von Restorff effect, can be generated from changing the meaningfulness or physical nature of the stimulus in some way, such as in size, shape, color, spacing and underlining.

== Examples ==
For example, if a person examines a shopping list with one item highlighted in bright green, they will be more likely to remember the highlighted item than any of the others. Additionally, in the following list of words – desk, chair, bed, table, chipmunk, dresser, stool, couch – "chipmunk" will be remembered the most as it stands out against the other words in its meaning (an animal, while the others are words for furniture).

An illustration of the Von Restorff effect — the goldfish stands out among a group of fruit and vegetable images, making it more likely to be remembered

== Theoretical explanations ==
There are different theories proposed to explain the increased performance of isolated items. The total-time hypothesis suggests that isolated items are rehearsed for a longer time in working memory compared to non-isolated items. This extended rehearsal period is thought to result in deeper and more elaborate encoding, producing a stronger and more durable memory trace than that formed for surrounded homogeneous items.

Another approach offers that subjects could consider the isolated items to be in their own special category in a free-recall task, making them easier to recollect. This process of unique categorisation creates a highly distinctive retrieval cue — because the isolated item occupies its own cognitive category, it can be located and recovered from memory more effectively than items grouped with others.

A separate explanation is based upon the analysis of the deep processing of similarities and differences among the items. Noticing that an item differs from its neighbours requires additional cognitive resources, meaning more attention is involuntarily directed towards it during encoding. Karis, Fabiani and Donchin (1984) provided empirical support for this attentional account, finding that participants who showed greater attentional engagement with isolated items also demonstrated significantly better recall for those items.

Debate surrounds whether perceptual salience and differential attention are necessary to produce this effect. Modern theory holds that the contextual incongruity of the isolate is what leads to the differential attention to this item — that is, it is the degree to which an item violates the established pattern of surrounding stimuli, rather than its properties alone, that determines how much additional attention it receives. Based on this assumption, an isolation effect would not be expected if the isolated item were presented prior to some consistent context, as no expectation would yet exist to be violated. However, this is a theory that goes against von Restorff's original findings, which demonstrated enhanced recall for isolated items regardless of their position in the list.

== Neural basis ==
Neuroimaging and electrophysiological research has shed light on the brain mechanisms underlying the von Restorff effect. Empirical data has shown a strong relationship between the von Restorff effect and measures of event-related potential (ERP) in the brain. Specifically, evidence has shown that exposure to novel or isolated items on a list for free recall generates an ERP with a larger amplitude, and this amplitude in turn predicts a higher likelihood of future recall and faster recognition of the items.

A waveform showing several ERP components, including the P300 (labeled P3), which is found to have a larger amplitude in response to isolated or distinctive items in the von Restorff effect.

This heightened neural response has been linked to activity in the frontal and perirhinal cortex. Parker, Wilding and Akerman (1998) demonstrated that lesions to these regions significantly reduced the isolation effect in both humans and non-human primates, indicating they are critical for detecting and processing distinctive stimuli. This finding also suggests the effect is not uniquely human, pointing to possible evolutionary roots in the detection of unexpected information in the environment.

Elhalal, Davelaar and Usher (2014) further found that the strength of the von Restorff effect correlates with fluid intelligence, defined as the capacity for abstract reasoning, such that individuals with higher fluid intelligence showed a stronger isolation effect, particularly for semantically distinctive items. More recently, Servais et al. (2024) found that the boosting effect of isolation-related novelty on recall appeared preserved in individuals with amnestic mild cognitive impairment, suggesting that novelty-related memory enhancement may operate independently of intact episodic memory systems, and that claims of reduced sensitivity to distinctive information as an early marker of cognitive decline warrant scrutiny.

== Age-related differences ==
There have been many studies that demonstrate and confirm the von Restorff effect in children and young adults, suggesting that the ability to benefit from item distinctiveness emerges early in development alongside other cognitive skills. Another study, Bireta, Surprenant and Neath (2008), found that college-aged students performed better when trying to remember an outstanding item in a list during an immediate memory-task whereas elderly individuals did not remember it well, suggesting a difference in processing strategies between the age groups. This age-related decline has been attributed to Naveh-Benjamin's (2000) associative deficit hypothesis, which proposes that ageing reduces the ability to form associations between a distinctive item and its surrounding context — a process considered central to the isolation effect.

In yet another study, Cimbalo and Brink (1982) similarly found that, although a significant von Restorff effect was produced amongst both age groups when manipulating font color, it was found to be smaller in older adults than younger adults. This too indicates that older people display fewer benefits for distinctive information compared to younger people, a pattern consistent with broader evidence that the effect is moderated by individual differences beyond age alone, including working memory capacity. Together, these findings suggest that while the von Restorff effect is present across the lifespan, its magnitude is sensitive to age-related changes in associative memory processes.

== Real-world applications ==
=== Education ===
The von Restorff effect has significant implications for educational practice. Making key information visually distinctive, through colour coding, bold text, or contrasting formatting, can improve students' retention and recall of important concepts. This principle is widely applied in textbook design, where headings and colour-coded diagrams isolate critical information, promoting deeper encoding.

=== Advertising and marketing ===
The von Restorff effect has been widely applied in advertising and consumer behaviour. Brands that design products or packaging to stand out visually from competitors benefit from the isolation effect, as consumers are more likely to notice and recall a product that differs distinctively from its surroundings. This principle underpins many common marketing strategies, such as using an unexpected colour scheme or a distinctive slogan to differentiate a product. Milosavljevic et al. (2012) demonstrated that visual saliency influences consumer choices more than preferences do at rapid decision speeds, and that this bias is strongest when individuals lack strong pre-existing brand preferences.

=== Eyewitness testimony ===
The von Restorff effect also has implications for the reliability of eyewitness testimony in legal settings. When a distinctive or unusual item is present at a crime scene, such as a weapon, witnesses tend to disproportionately encode and recall that element, potentially at the expense of other details. This selective memory enhancement can produce imbalanced accounts in which striking elements are vividly recalled while equally important but more commonplace details are overlooked, which may affect the completeness and accuracy of eyewitness reports.

== Limitations and criticisms ==
A central methodological concern is the ecological validity of existing research. The majority of studies rely on artificial laboratory paradigms — typically presenting participants with short word lists — and Kamp et al. (2025) demonstrated that such designs may systematically underestimate the effect due to methodological constraints. Future research employing more naturalistic stimuli, such as prose passages or real learning environments, would strengthen confidence in the effect's broader applicability.

A further criticism is that existing theoretical accounts remain largely descriptive rather than explanatory. While distinctiveness, attention, and retrieval cue accounts each offer partial explanations, none has been shown to fully account for the effect across all experimental conditions. Wallace (1965) noted this theoretical incompleteness, suggesting it reflects a longstanding gap in the literature that remains unresolved.

Furthermore, individual susceptibility to the effect varies considerably. Karis, Fabiani and Donchin (1984) identified striking individual differences in susceptibility to the effect, with participants employing complex mnemonic strategies showing little to no isolation effect, suggesting the effect is moderated by individual differences in memory ability and cognitive strategy rather than reflecting a universal mechanism. Addressing this variability, potentially through pre-registered studies with larger, more diverse samples, represents an important direction for future research.

== See also ==
- List of cognitive biases
- List of memory biases
- Serial position effect
