= Social cryptomnesia =

Social cryptomnesia is a psychological and sociological idea. It is a cognitive bias experienced by entire cultures following social change.

Cryptomnesia refers to an implicit memory phenomenon of an individual’s false belief that their idea is original; however, in reality, they have previously come across the said idea and have forgotten that they did. Cryptomnesia is likely to occur when there is source confusion, the error in identifying a memory’s source, due to high cognitive load at the time when the idea was first considered. This is in line with the Cognitive Load Theory, suggesting that humans have a limited capacity in their working memory, and when it is overloaded or impacted due to factors like stress, individuals can have the tendency to avoid the source of incoming information.

Social cryptomnesia is a failure to remember the origin of a change, in which people know that a change has occurred in society, but forget how this change occurred; that is, the steps that were taken to bring this change about, and who took these steps. This may lead to reduced social credit towards the minorities who made major sacrifices that led to the change in societal values.

== Minority marginalization ==
A minority group is defined as any group that is marginalized in the society they live in due to cultural or physical characteristics. They face unfair treatment and are discriminated against. Minority groups in a society can also be referred to as the “subordinate group”, whereas the majority of people are called the “dominant group”. The Scapegoat Theory suggests that dominant groups can position “unfocused aggression” on minorities.

Throughout history, there have been several notable social movements of minorities leading to revolutions; while the revolutions are remembered by the public, those who have been leading the change have often been forgotten. So, the societal system favors the dominant groups without giving credit to minorities. Social cryptomnesia is described as collective oblivion with social control. It causes the changes done by minority groups to be disregarded, which in turn could lead to further disparity within a society.

== Psychological theories ==
There are different possible theories behind this phenomenon explained through ultimate causes.

=== Moscovici’s minority influence ===
Previous research done on group conformity showed how individuals are influenced by the choice of the majority. The study proved that individuals conformed to the answers of the group in public but disregarded them in private. Moscovici argues that behavioral style is the source of influence, especially highlighting that the consistent behavior of minorities can affect the majority of the population. He describes four stages of influence:

1. Revelation: Minority presents their conflicting views to the majority.
2. Incubation: The majority assesses the arguments of the minority.
3. Conversion: Those in the majority begin to accept and internalize the arguments of the minority privately.
4. Innovation: After understanding that others began to share the same views, members of the majority began to publicly acknowledge the views of the minority.

In Moscovici’s four-stage theory, there are two limitations. First of all, it is uncertain how the process from conversion to innovation takes place as at the conversion stage, individuals internalize at a private level. Secondly, the stages end after the fourth one: at this point, the normative position of the majority is eliminated as they have revealed their new views publicly. Historically, it is seen that even with this, the changes that minorities lead can be disregarded. Therefore, Butera et al. (2009) suggests that social cryptomnesia acts as a “fifth stage” of this process.

=== Social Identity Theory ===
A related theory could be Social Identity Theory. The theory entails how individuals identify with the groups they belong to, which leads to the idea of social categorisation. The groups one belongs to are in-groups, whereas the ones they do not are the out-groups. In order to maintain self-esteem, people perceive their in-groups as superior. This leads to the discrimination of out-groups. Evidence suggests that social identification affects behavior. In terms of decision-making, individuals conform to the “normative leanings'' of their group. Therefore, it could be that the idea of outgroups of minorities do not yield attention to the changes that minorities make, increasing the chance of the process being forgotten. The idea of “groupthink” supports this argument as it refers to group members accepting a certain conclusion that represents a “group consensus”. However, for “groupthink” to occur, there have to be high levels of cohesiveness, which poses a limitation.

=== Cultural evolution ===
One of the factors enabling cultural evolution is transmission. From an evolutionary perspective, cultural transmission occurs when individuals pass on information to other generations through social learning. It could be that social cryptomnesia occurs because of “content-biased cultural transmission”. Sperber (1996) describes the situation as “cultural attraction”, which is how cultural representations are distorted to match the existing cognitive biases. As majorities are more prevalent in terms of making change, individuals could be attributing the idea of a change to the dominant group instead of one of the subordinate ones, explaining the functioning of social cryptomnesia. This is in line with Piaget’s schema theory: individuals perceive the world around them and shape incoming knowledge according to their prior beliefs.

== Women's rights ==
The progress made in the first wave of feminism includes healthcare, education, and the right to vote. These rights are considered to be just by the general population, yet the actions taken by the suffragettes (and suffragists) to get to this point are frequently ignored.

Feminist movements are victims of social cryptomnesia. While women’s rights are now acknowledged in most countries, the process of gaining acknowledgement is not recognized by the general population. Furthermore, women are still alienated within society, suggesting that the majority of society has not yielded adequate attention to these changes. Due to this, in various areas of everyday life, women face gender-based discrimination and negative stereotypes, while sometimes seen as extremists or radical. This may prevent social change from occurring, even when people agree it is necessary.

Social cryptomnesia related to sexism can be reduced with conscientization, which relies on critical reflection on the issue. This technique was used in social and political issues before; thus, the same technique can be adjusted for other minorities in decreasing the effects of social cryptomnesia by conducting further research on it in the future. Nevertheless, since different minorities face varying levels of this phenomenon, this may not be as effective as planned. Additionally, it may be possible to reduce these negative effects of social cryptomnesia by making individuals aware of how social cryptomnesia may contribute to their biases.
