= Aesthetic–usability effect =

Paradox

The aesthetic–usability effect describes a paradox that people perceive more aesthetic designs as much more intuitive than those considered to be less aesthetically pleasing. It is an example of cognitive bias. The effect has been observed in several experiments and has significant implications regarding the acceptance, use, and performance of a design. Usability and aesthetics are the two most important factors in assessing the overall user experience for an application. Usability and aesthetics are judged by a user's reuse expectations, and then their post-use, or experienced, final judgement. A user's cognitive style can influence how they interact with and perceive an application, which in turn can influence their judgment of the application.

== History ==
Masaaki Kurosu and Kaori Kashimura, researchers at Hitachi in Tokyo, demonstrated the aesthetic–usability effect in their study. The results of the analysis show that "the apparent usability is less correlated with the inherent usability compared to the apparent beauty. ... This suggests that the user may be strongly affected by the aesthetic aspect of the interface even when they try to evaluate the interface in its functional aspects, and it is suggested that the interface designers should strive not only to improve the inherent usability but also brush up the apparent usability or the aesthetic aspect of the interface". In other words, the aesthetic–usability effect plays an important role in user experience.

== The aesthetics factor ==
The aesthetics factor was manipulated by differing in terms of color combination, visual layout, and text font, which determine the level of aesthetics. According to the study by Hall and Hanna, users perceived websites with white–black and black–white color combinations as less pleasing and stimulating than ones with non-grayscale color combinations. A few previous studies—Kurosu & Kashimura (1995), Tractinsky (1997), Tractinsky (2000)—demonstrated a significant effect of visual layout on perceived aesthetics in experiments with ATM layouts with different arrangements of content items. In an experiment using home robotic control systems, Conklin (2006) showed that the manipulation of interface aesthetics with the use of color, layout, and font style was successful. Moreover, McCracken and Wolfe (2004) recommended using Georgia or Verdana font styles not intermixed in the body text of a website rather than Times New Roman or Arial intermixed in the body text.

== The effect of cognitive style ==
Cognitive style is a characteristic of the user, and can be measured by cognitive styles analysis. The interface and functional features of an application can be harmonized or non-harmonized in accordance with a user's cognitive style. Cognitive styles fall on two orthogonal dimensions: Wholist–Analytic and Verbal–Imagery. So an application success might vary, depending on how it caters to individual cognitive style. Imagers are more influenced by aesthetics factor and tend to utilize the aesthetic features in understanding and using an application. In 2011, Sangwon Lee and Richard J. Koubeks showed that the effect of aesthetics factor on pre-use preference was significantly different based on cognitive styles. There were significant differences in the pre-use preference of the changing aesthetics but not between the two types of cognitive styles of the test subjects. The same applied to the pre-use usability factor of the application as well. There was little difference in the effect of aesthetics on Wholist–Analytic versus Verbal–Imagery. This may be surprising considering that imagers think in pictures (visually), versus verbalizers who think in words. The effect of usability on the time performance was not significantly different between the two groups.

== Cultural aesthetics for user interface design ==
Usability and aesthetics are two important factors for designing user interfaces. Aesthetic tastes differ from culture to culture. Therefore, it is unreasonable to design a single common user interface for everyone and to expect it to attract all audiences equally. An idea is that software may automatically compose personalised interfaces based on the individual cultural backgrounds of its users. There are several different factors defining the user's cultural background, such as the user's first language, religion, and education level, and the form of education and the social or political norms of their culture. All of those factors are very important aspects of defining the cultures of users and influencing the aesthetic preferences of users.

== The influence of design aesthetics in usability testing ==
Aesthetics designs are more effective at fostering positive attitudes than unaesthetic designs, and make people more tolerant of design problems. The design aesthetics is employed in two ways: it may refer to the objective features of a stimulus or to the subjective reaction to the specific product features. A study between two functionally identical mobile phones with highly appealing visual appearance not appealing visual appearance to determine the influence of appearance on perceived usability, performance measures and perceived attractiveness. The data confirmed that the aesthetically appealing prototype was rated significantly more attractive than the unappealing prototype. Furthermore, an interaction between prototype and product usage was found, showing an increase in the perceived attractiveness rating of the aesthetically appealing prototype after product usage whereas the attractiveness-rating of the unappealing prototype decreased after product usage. The main effect of product usage (before vs. after) was not significant. The results showed that participants using the highly appealing phone rated their appliance as being more usable than participants operating the unappealing model. Furthermore, the visual appearance of the phone had a positive effect on performance, leading to reduced task completion times for the attractive model.

== The influence of design aesthetics on perceived value ==
In 2021, a study was conducted in which researchers measured the effect of design aesthetics on the perceived value of a product through Event Related Potentials. The researchers came from the Nanjing Forestry University and the Tianshou College of Architecture at Ningbo University. The researchers referenced multiple studies that previously proved that “visual appeal can improve the perceived value of products for consumers”. However, the main focus of the study was to explore how design aesthetics affect the cognitive processing in consumers, especially at the neural level. They cited that without "reducing the importance of functionality, brand, and other attributes, the aim of [the] study was to examine the influence of design aesthetics on the price expectation–based neural response of consumers to products”.

In order to understand the results of the study, some key scientific terms must be defined. Event related potentials (ERPs) is the measured brain response that is the direct response to a stimulus. The study considered the frontal and parietal regions of the brain. The frontal lobe is associated with the influence of stimulus on visual attention, while the parietal lobe is associated with the influence of stimulus on visual attention. The indicators referenced in this study were N100, P200, and N400. N100 and P200 are associated with attention and emotional incitement respectively. In the frontal lobe, the N100 amplitude reflects the influence of a stimulus on visual attention. The N100 component distributed in the parietal lobe, alternately, reflects the influence of a stimulus on identification processing. The P200 amplitude has been established in multiple studies as an assessor of design aesthetics. Finally, the N400 amplitude is associated with comprehension, and is especially sensitive to semantic incongruence. A larger N400 amplitude suggests that the value of design aesthetics perceived by users is inconsistent with their expectations. The method of the study involved 40 participants, with different majors and no aesthetics or design education background. Participants were presented with black and white images of "high-aesthetic & low-aesthetic" products. The high aesthetic products were Red-dot Design award-winners, while low aesthetic products were purchased from online retail companies (ie Amazon). The images were marked with the same price (CN¥299) and no brand information. Participants were then asked to decide whether or not they would like to buy the displayed product within 1500 milliseconds.

The results of the study indicated that buying intent ratios were significantly higher for high-aesthetic items over low-aesthetic items. Additionally, participants making the do not buy decision made it much faster than those who decided to buy the product. The N100 amplitudes in the frontal region indicated that high–design-aesthetic products also attracted more attention from participants. Furthermore, High-aesthetic items produced more positive emotions than low according to the P200 amplitudes, and participants demonstrated that there was a greater inconsistency in price to value perceived in low-aesthetic products, seen in larger N400 amplitudes. This was seen due to participants experiencing semantic incongruence as well as inconsistency between expected and labeled product prices. The overall conclusion of this study was that in general, design aesthetics significantly influenced consumer behavior. Additionally, The ERP results suggest that “an excellent design increases the product value”.
