= Information bias (psychology) =

Cognitive bias

Information bias is a cognitive bias to seek information when it does not affect action. An example of information bias is believing that the more information that can be acquired to make a decision, the better, even if that extra information is irrelevant for the decision.

== Example ==
In an experiment (Baron, Beattie & Hershey 1988), subjects considered this diagnostic problem involving fictitious diseases:

A female patient is presenting symptoms and a history which both suggest a diagnosis of globoma, with about 80% probability. If it isn't globoma, it's either popitis or flapemia. Each disease has its own treatment which is ineffective against the other two diseases. A test called the ET scan would certainly yield a positive result if the patient had popitis, and a negative result if she has flapemia. If the patient has globoma, a positive and negative result are equally likely. If the ET scan was the only test you could do, should you do it? Why or why not?

Many subjects answered that they would conduct the ET scan even if it were costly, and even if it were the only test that could be done. However, the test in question does not affect the course of action as to what treatment should be done. Because the probability of globoma is so high with a probability of 80%, the patient would be treated for globoma no matter what the test says. Globoma is the most probable disease before or after the ET scan.

In this example, we can calculate the value of the ET scan by considering 100 patients, of which 80 have globoma. Since it is equally likely for a patient with globoma to have a positive or negative ET scan result, 40 people will have a positive ET scan and 40 people will have a negative ET scan. The remaining 20 patients have either popitis or flapemia. Out of those, the 10 patients with popitis will have a positive ET scan while the 10 patients with flapemia will have a negative scan. Thus, out of the 50 patients with a positive result (40 globoma + 10 popitis), 80% have globoma; likewise, out of the 50 patients with a negative test (40 globoma + 10 flapemia), 80% have globoma. The probability of globoma is therefore entirely unaffected by the result of the test, regardless of how it turns out. The test can provide no information that would affect the decision to treat the globoma, so it should not be carried out. While this example illustrates information bias in a clinical setting, similar patterns can also be observed in everyday contexts such as media consumption.

== See also ==
- Shared information bias
- Cognitive psychology
- List of cognitive biases

== Studies ==
- Baron, Jonathan; Beattie, Jane; Hershey, John C (1988). "Heuristics and biases in diagnostic reasoning" (PDF). Organizational Behavior and Human Decision Processes. 42 (1): 88–110. doi:10.1016/0749-5978(88)90021-0. Archived from the original on 2016-03-05.
