= John Gourville =

American economist

John T. Gourville is an American economist currently the Albert J. Weatherhead Jr. Professor of Business Administration at Harvard Business School.
