= Leidy Klotz =

American professor and retired soccer player

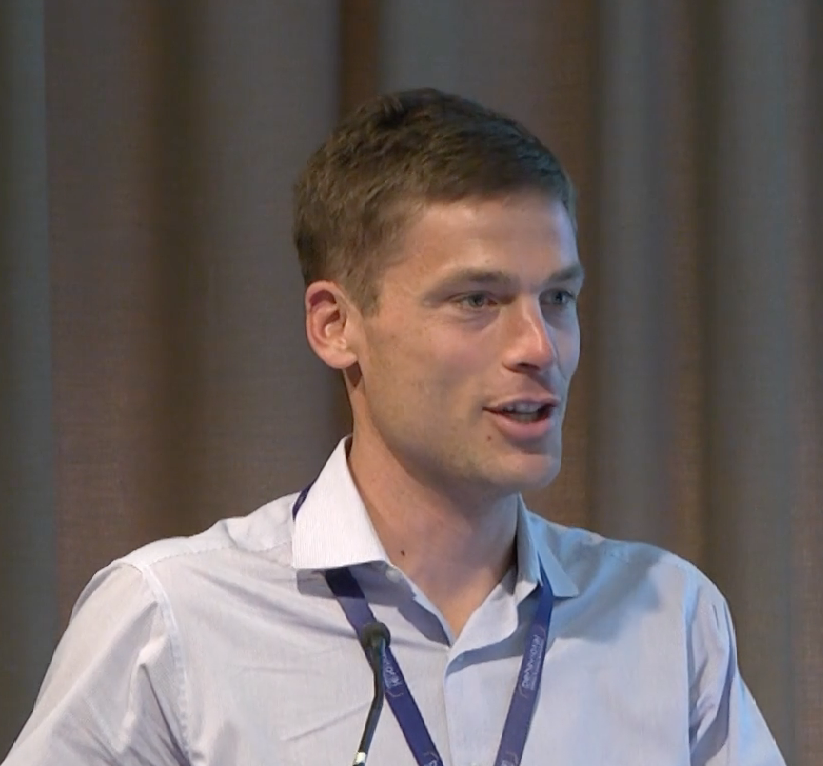
- Born: July 14, 1978 (age 48); United States
- Education: Lafayette College (BS) University of Washington (MS) Pennsylvania State University (PhD)
- Awards: National Science Foundation, CAREER National Science Foundation, Interdisciplinary Science and Education (INSPIRE) Nerdscholar, 40 under 40
- Scientific career
- Fields: Design, Behavioral Science, Sustainability
- Workplaces: University of Virginia, 2016– Clemson University, 2008–2016
- Website: https://www.leidyklotz.com/

Leidy Klotz (born July 14, 1978) is an American scientist and author who studies and writes about design and problem-solving. He is a professor of engineering and architecture at the University of Virginia. Klotz has published in scientific journals including Nature and Science Advances and in other publications such as The Washington Post, Harvard Business Review, Fast Company, and The Globe and Mail. He is also the author of two popular books: Subtract: The Untapped Science of Less (2021), which discusses design and problem-solving, and Sustainability through Soccer (2016), a work about systems thinking.

Klotz is a retired United Soccer League soccer player.

== Soccer career ==
Leidy Klotz
Personal information
- Position: Midfielder

Youth career
- 1996–1999: Lafayette College

Senior career*
Years	Team	Apps	(Gls)
2000–2001	Pittsburgh Riverhounds	31	(3)
- * Club domestic league appearances and goals

Klotz played professionally for the Pittsburgh Riverhounds, making 31 appearances and scoring 3 goals in the 2000 and 2001 seasons. Klotz was a 2x Division I All-American at Lafayette College. He was inducted into the Lafayette College Hall of Fame in 2016 and the Homer High School Hall of Fame in 2009.

== Scientific career ==
Klotz is currently a professor of Engineering and Architecture at the University of Virginia. He studies and teaches the science of design, and, in 2019, co-chaired a Nature Sustainability Expert Panel on this topic. He has published articles in Nature and Science and, as of 2022, has an h-index of 24. His research has been covered by The Washington Post, The Wall Street Journal, The World Economic Forum, Grist, Scientific American, and newspapers around the world.

=== Books ===
IN A GOOD PLACE: How the Spaces Where We Live, Work, and Play Can Help Us Thrive (Little, Brown, 2026). In a Good Place draws on evidence across psychology, architecture, and more to show how deliberate engagement with physical spaces can reliably enhance well-being. The book argues that physical environments are one of the best ways to meet basic psychological needs for agency, competence, and connection.

SUBTRACT: The Untapped Science of Less (Flatiron Books, 2021). Subtract has received various accolades.^{,}^{,}^{,}^{,}^{,} The book builds from Klotz's research showing that the human mind tends to add before taking away, even to our detriment. The first half of the book discusses biological, cultural, and socio-economic explanations for this tendency. The second half of the book offers ways to overcome harmful subtraction neglect, drawing from science and from subtracting examples and exemplars such as: Maya Lin, Elinor Ostrom, The Embarcadero Freeway, Balance Bikes, Anna Keichline, and Bruce Springsteen.

He also wrote Sustainability through Soccer with University of California Press in 2016.

=== Notable research articles ===
- "People Systematically Overlook Subtractive Changes." Nature. 592. 258–261. Adams, G., Converse, B., Hales, A., and Klotz, L. (2021)
- "Embracing Behavioral Science." The Bridge – National Academy of Engineering. 50 (4). Klotz, L., and Pickering, J. (2020)
- "Beyond rationality in engineering design for sustainability." Nature Sustainability. 1: 225–233. Klotz, L., Weber, E., Johnson, E., Shealy, E., Hernandez, M., and Gordon, B. (2018)
- "Sustainability as a route to broaden participation in engineering." Journal of Engineering Education, 103(1): 137–153. Klotz, L., et al. (2014).
- "A framework for sustainable whole systems design." Design Studies. 33(5) 456–479. Blizzard, J., and Klotz, L. (2012).

=== Science communication ===
Klotz writes about research and design for popular outlets such as The Washington Post, Fast Company, and Harvard Business Review.

Klotz frequently appears on top science podcasts and radio shows such as Freakonomics Radio, Mindscape with Sean Carroll, the Michael Shermer Show, and PRI The World.
