= Due column betting =

Type of fixed-profit betting strategy

Due-column betting (also: due column betting) is a type of fixed-profit betting strategy whereby a bettor increases the amount they wager on a single proposition after each successive loss. According to this system, the bettor determines a target profit before they begin betting. Then they increase their bet on propositions following a loss in such a way that a win will recover the sum of all amounts they have lost from their preceding bets plus gain them their predetermined profit.

While similar to both the Martingale and Labouchere strategies, Due-column betting differs from other like betting systems in that it accounts for the odds variance in successive parimutuel propositions. Still, it is often used interchangeably with the casino gambling term "progression system", which refers to several similar betting systems typically employed at casino gaming tables.

== System explanation ==
Due-column wagering is considered a fixed-profit system because the due-column bettor determines the desired profit before betting begins. However, whereas with percentage-based money-management systems the bettor varies their bets as a percentage of their bankroll, with a series of due-column bets they bet the amount necessary to make their desired profit plus the total amount necessary to recuperate what has been lost in all previous wagers. The idea is to double the subsequent bet after each loss and reduce it to the original amount after each win. In the end, the winnings cover all losses of previous bets.

Supposedly betting this way ensures that if the better correctly calls a single race at any point in the series they will have profited and can cease betting or begin a new series. Proponents of the system argue that the probability of experiencing ten consecutive losses if the bettor is an average, 33 percent handicapper is 1.82 percent. Consequently, they conclude, a due-column bettor has a given probability of profiting from slightly more than 98 percent of all 10-race series. And, they therefore believe, a due-column bettor will win the product of their designated profit times the expected percentage of wins per the number of series played; or, assuming the bettor's desired profit is $100, they will win about $9,800 per 100 series played.

The coining of "due-column" is due to bettors' creating charts to track their bets. A typical due-column chart is as follows:

Race	Due	Odds	Bet	Result
1	$3.00	3:2	$2.00	Lost
2	$8.00	7:5	$6.00	Lost
3	$17.00	7:5	$12.00	Lost
4	$32.00	6:5	$27.00	Lost
5	$62.00	6:5	$52.00	Lost
6	$117.00	7:5	$84.00	Lost
7	$204.00	4:5	$255.00	Lost
8	$462.00	1:1	$462.00	Won

== Mathematical analysis ==
There are several problems with the assumptions that due-column bettors make, not the least of which is that the mathematical basis for the system is flawed. Assuming a bettor in any series of horse races is a 33 percent handicapper with an average mutuel of $5.00. Such a bettor's mathematical expectation can be expressed as follows:

E(x) = .33 <--> ($1.50) - .67 = -$.175

According to this analysis, the average bettor's mathematical expectation would not provide a profit, but a loss because their expectation is a negative gain every bet. As a result, the bettor playing the due-column system will only multiply their losses over time. After 10 losses given the expression above, for instance, the bettor would average a loss of $1.75, thus making an upward-sloping expectation impossible.

Theoretically, the solution to this flaw in the due-column system is for the bettor to consistently handicap and have a mutuel above the average rates. If, for example, a bettor had a handicap of 35 percent and mutuel of $6 their expectation could be expressed as follows:

E(x) = .35 x (2) - .65 = .05

This above-average bettor would then have a positive expected gain of 5 percent or $.05 every race. Still, should that bettor attempt to apply the due-column system to increase their gains they will run into a second problem: diminishing returns.

The bettor would run into diminishing returns because, as seen in the example due-column chart above, the bets they must make increase exponentially compared to each preceding bet with each successive loss. Because of the nature of parimutuel betting, then, the bettor's larger wagers will depress their payout odds. As a result, the bettor's real expected return for the session will deflate far below their original target profit.

Furthermore, in horse racing no single horse runs more than one race. So, though jockeys might ride more than one race, each race is arguably an "independent event" and the due-column bettor will therefore run afoul of the law of independent trials; that is, believing the outcome of each event is significantly dependent on the outcome of the last they will commit the gambler's fallacy.

As with any series of independent propositions, then, only with trials numbering in the thousands can a due-column bettor ensure that, on average, their historical number of wins will match their probable number of wins. Consequently, experiencing more than 10 losses in a single series is likely to occur according to the law of large numbers, and as the chart above shows, continuing to play the due-column system will require risking a bankroll proportionately far too large to wager for the expected return.

For all these reasons using the due-column system is not only unproductive, but counterproductive. Because of this many contemporary gambling strategists strongly advise players not to consider it a winning strategy.
