= Oscar's grind =

Gambling strategy

Oscar's Grind is a betting strategy used by gamblers on wagers where the outcome is evenly distributed between two results of equal value (like flipping a coin). It is an archetypal positive progression strategy. It is also called Hoyle's Press. In German and French, it is often referred to as the Pluscoup Progression. It was first documented by Allan Wilson in his 1965 book, The Casino Gambler's Guide. This progression is based on calculating the size of bets so that in the event of a losing streak, if and when a same-length winning streak occurs, a profit is obtained. The main concept is that there are periods of many wins and periods of many losses. Losses and wins often come in streaks. Ideally, bets are kept low on losing streaks and increased on winning streaks, which hopefully will follow.

== Description ==
Oscar's Grind divides the entire gambling event into sessions. A session is a sequence of consecutive wagers made until 1 unit of profit is won. Each session begins by betting 1 unit, and ends by winning 1 unit of profit. If the gambler loses, the session continues and the bet is repeated. Each time the gambler wins the game following a lost game, the bet is increased by 1 unit. This increase is not performed if the current bet warrants achieving at least 1 unit of profit in total, in case the next game is won. On the contrary, the bet size in such a situation should be decreased to assure exactly 1 unit is won.

=== Algorithm ===
unit := 1
betsize := unit
profit := 0

repeat
    bet
    if bet_won then
        profit := profit + betsize
        if profit < unit then
            if profit + betsize + unit > unit then
                betsize := unit − profit
            else
                betsize := betsize + unit
    else
        profit := profit − betsize
until profit = unit

=== Example ===
Example of a session
Bet size	Result	Profit	Comment
1	Loss	−1	Bet size stays the same
1	Loss	−2	Bet size stays the same
1	Loss	−3	Bet size stays the same
1	Loss	−4	Bet size stays the same
1	Loss	−5	Bet size stays the same
1	Win	−4	Bet size is 2 units now
2	Loss	−6	Bet size remains 2 units
2	Win	−4	Bet size increases to 3 units
3	Win	−1	Only 2 units needed to achieve profit
2	Win	1	Session ends

== Analysis ==
Oscar's grind is the same as Martingale-based and Labouchère system in the sense that if there is an infinite amount to wager and time, every session will make a profit. Not meeting these conditions will result in an inevitable loss of the entire stake in the long run. Only 500 losses in a row can come from a 500 unit bankroll, and if occasional wins increase the betsize, this number decreases significantly. Oscar's grind is based on losing streaks being "compensated" by winning streaks in the short run, and in the example above, a five-long losing streak was equalised by a three-long winning streak. If there is "compensation" with a five-long winning streak, three units of profit are gained. The base of the system originates in a hot-hand bias, but winning and losing streaks in gambling have no mathematical ground or proof.

== Variations ==
Oscar's Grind can be applied to non-even bets as well ("streets" in roulette or "doubling" in blackjack); one just has to keep track of the amount and increase the betsize after wins accordingly. There are also variations that try to reduce the variance by waiting for a couple of wins before increasing the betsize. As it is with all betting progressions, no variation of Oscar's Grind will make a profit in the long run. Another variation involves setting aside a portion of each win as profit that is not used for future bets. This method seeks to guarantee that some amount of money is retained even if a losing streak follows a win, thereby reducing the overall risk.

== See also ==
- Gambler's fallacy
