= Gambling =

Wagering something of value on a random event

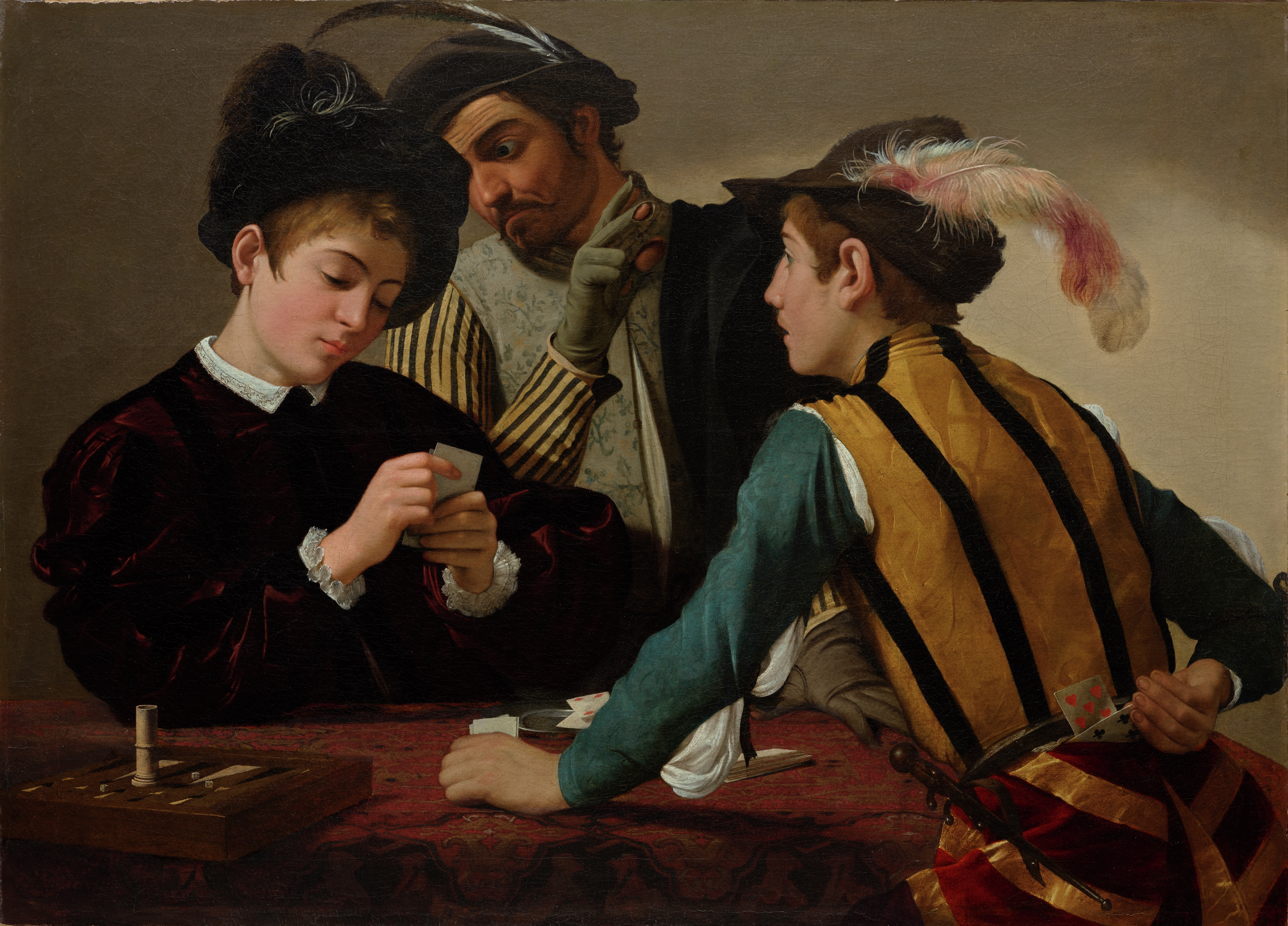
Caravaggio, The Cardsharps (c. 1594), depicting card sharps

Gambling (also known as betting or gaming) is the wagering of something of value ("the stakes") on a random event with the intent of winning something else of value, where instances of strategy are discounted. Gambling thus requires three elements to be present: consideration (an amount wagered), risk (chance), and a prize. The outcome of the wager is often immediate, such as a single roll of dice, a spin of a roulette wheel, or a horse crossing the finish line, but longer time frames are also common, allowing wagers on the outcome of a future sports contest or even an entire sports season.

The term "gaming" in this context typically refers to instances in which the activity has been specifically permitted by law. The two words are not mutually exclusive; i.e., a "gaming" company offers (legal) "gambling" activities to the public and may be regulated by one of many gaming control boards, for example, the Nevada Gaming Control Board. However, this distinction is not universally observed in the English-speaking world. For instance, in the United Kingdom, the regulator of gambling activities is called the Gambling Commission. The word gaming is used more frequently since the rise of computer and video games to describe activities that do not necessarily involve wagering, especially online gaming, with the new usage still not having displaced the old usage as the primary definition in common dictionaries.

Gambling is also a major international commercial activity, with the legal gambling market totaling an estimated $335 billion in 2009. In other forms, gambling can be conducted with materials that have a value, but are not real money. For example, players of marbles games might wager marbles, and likewise games of Pogs or Magic: The Gathering can be played with the collectible game pieces (respectively, small discs and trading cards) as stakes, resulting in a metagame regarding the value of a player's collection of pieces.

== History ==
Gambling dates back at least to the Paleolithic period, before written history. In Mesopotamia the earliest six-sided dice date to about 3000 BCE. However, they were based on astragali dating back thousands of years earlier. In China, gambling houses were widespread in the first millennium BCE, and betting on fighting animals was common. Lotto games and dominoes (precursors of Pai Gow) appeared in China as early as the 10th century.

Playing cards appeared in the 9th century CE in China. Records trace gambling in Japan back at least as far as the 14th century.

Poker, the most popular U.S. card game associated with gambling, derives from the Persian game As-Nas, dating back to the 17th century.

The first known casino, the Ridotto, started operating in 1638 in Venice, Italy.

=== Great Britain ===
Gambling has been a main recreational activity in Great Britain for centuries. Queen Elizabeth I chartered a lottery that was drawn in 1569. Horseracing has been a favorite theme for over three centuries. It has been heavily regulated. Historically much of the opposition comes from Nonconformist Protestants, and from social reformers.

=== Singapore ===
Gambling has been part of Singapore's history, though it was strictly controlled by the government for many years. In the mid-20th century, illegal gambling was common. However, with the opening of regulated casinos in 2010, the approach shifted. Today, the government enforces strict laws to promote responsible gambling and prevent illegal activities.

=== United States ===
Gambling has been a popular activity in the United States for centuries. It has also been suppressed by law in many areas for almost as long. By the early 20th century, gambling was almost uniformly outlawed throughout the U.S. and thus became a largely illegal activity, helping to spur the growth of the mafia and other criminal organizations. The late 20th century saw a softening in attitudes towards gambling and a relaxation of laws against it.

== Regulation ==
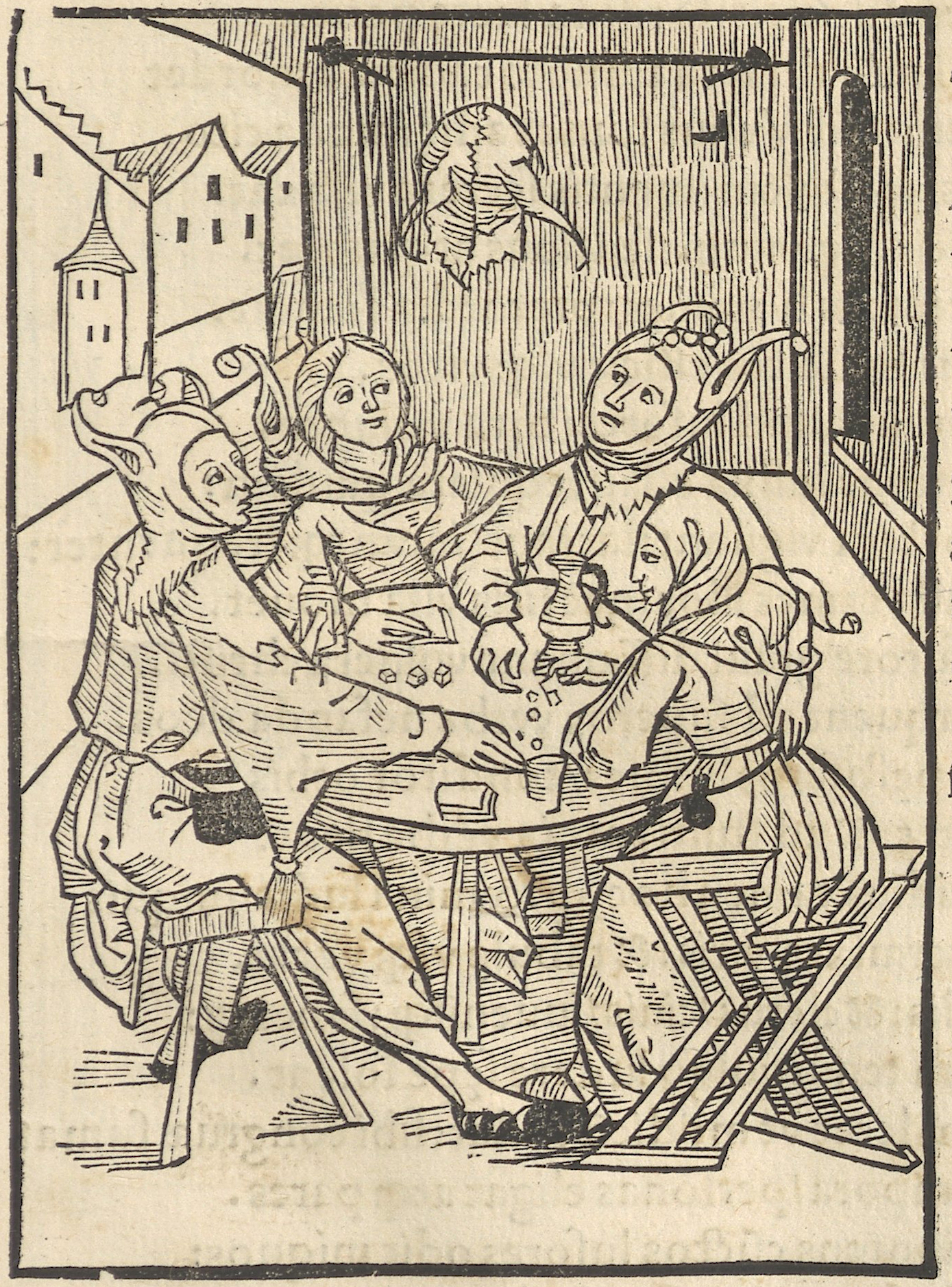
Gamblers in the Ship of Fools, 1494

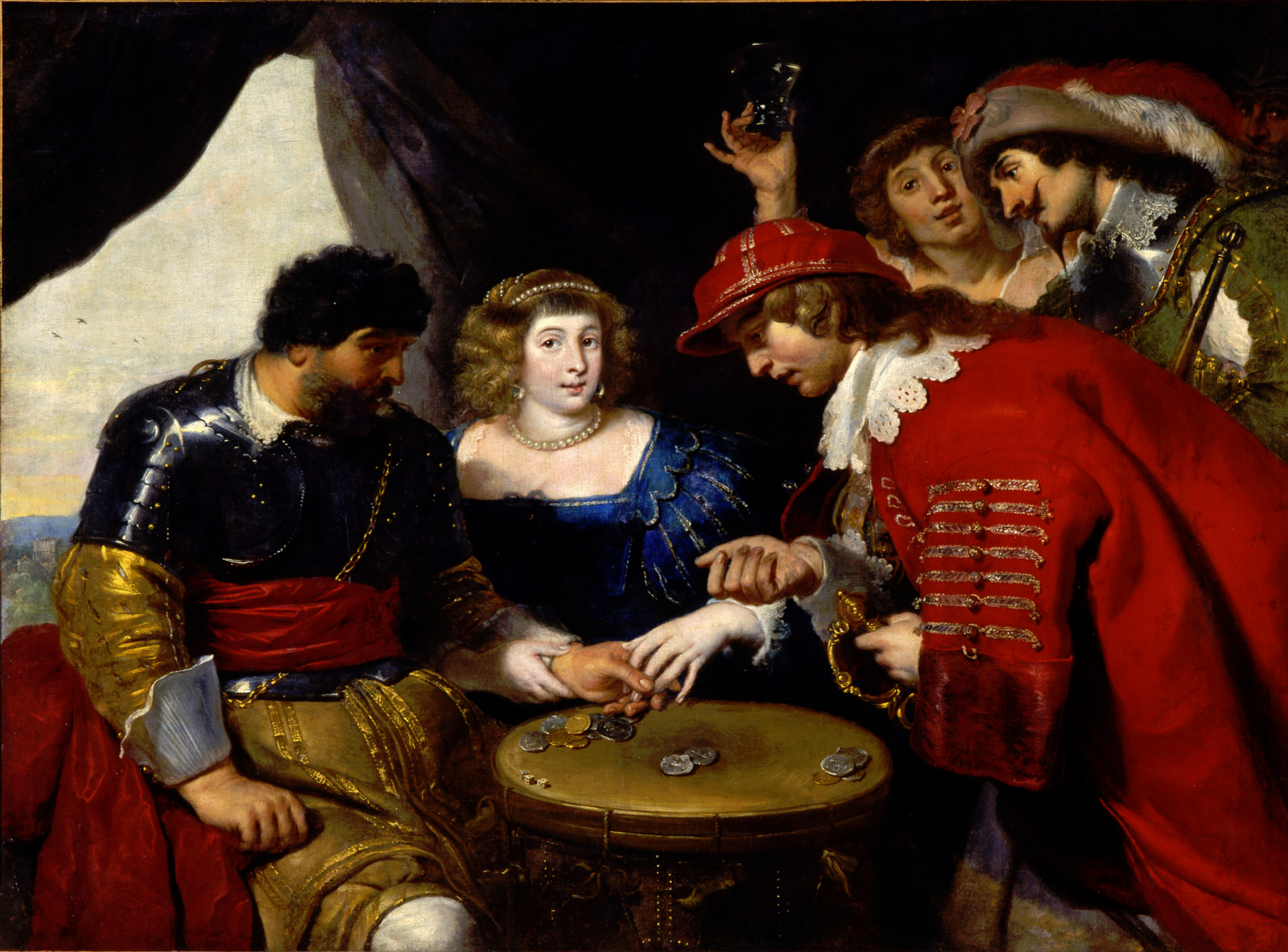
"Players and courtesans under a tent" by Cornelis de Vos

Many jurisdictions, both local and national, either ban gambling or tightly regulate it by licensing vendors. Such regulation generally leads to gambling tourism and illegal gambling in areas where it is not allowed. The involvement of governments, through regulation and taxation, has led to close ties between many governments and gambling organizations, with legal gambling providing significant government revenue, as in Monaco and Macau, China.

Most jurisdictions that allow gambling require participants to be above a certain age. In some jurisdictions, the gambling age varies by type of gambling. For example, in many American states one must be over 21 to enter a casino, but may buy a lottery ticket after turning 18.

There is generally legislation requiring that gambling devices be statistically random, to prevent manufacturers from making some high-payoff results impossible. Since these high payoffs have very low probability, a house bias can quite easily be missed unless the devices are checked carefully.

=== Insurance ===
Because contracts of insurance have many features in common with wagers, insurance contracts are often distinguished in law as agreements in which either party has an interest in the "bet-upon" outcome beyond the specific financial terms; for example, a "bet" with an insurer on whether one's house will burn down is not gambling, but rather insurance, as the homeowner has an obvious interest in the continued existence of the home independent of the purely financial aspects of the "bet" (i.e., the insurance policy). Nonetheless, both insurance and gambling contracts are typically considered aleatory contracts under most legal systems, though they are subject to different forms of regulation.

=== Asset recovery ===
Under common law, particularly English Law (English unjust enrichment), a gambling contract may not give a casino bona fide purchaser status, permitting the recovery of stolen funds in some situations. In Lipkin Gorman v Karpnale Ltd, where a solicitor used stolen funds to gamble at a casino, the House of Lords overruled the High Court's previous verdict, adjudicating that the casino return the stolen funds less those subject to any change of position defence. U.S. Law precedents are somewhat similar.

In the Perry Mason novel The Case of the Singing Skirt, involving the gambler's spouse, the actual case of Novo v. Hotel Del Rio was cited.

== Religious views ==
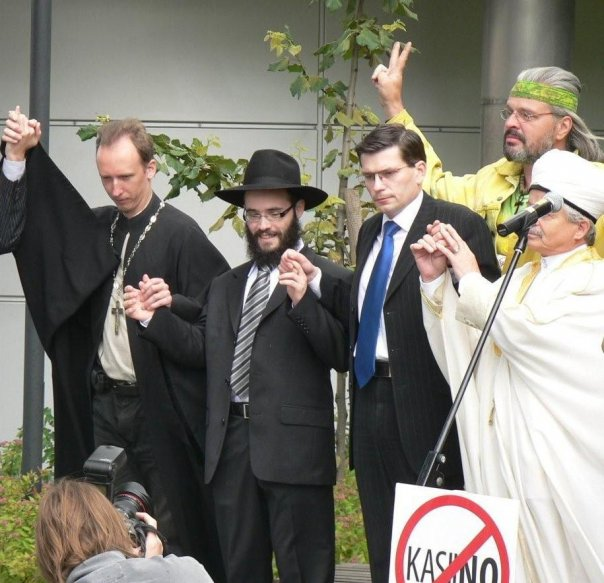
Max Kaur and religious leaders protest against gambling, Tallinn, Estonia.

=== Buddhism ===
The Buddha stated gambling as a source of destruction in Singalovada Sutra.

Professions that are seen to violate the precept against theft include working in the gambling industry.

=== Hinduism ===
Ancient Hindu poems like the Gambler's Lament and Mahabharata testify to the existence of gambling among Indians, while highlighting its destructive impact. The text Arthashastra (c. 4th century BCE) recommends taxation and control of gambling.

=== Judaism ===
Ancient Jewish authorities frowned on gambling, even disqualifying professional gamblers from testifying in court.

=== Christianity ===
Although the Bible does not condemn gambling, the desire to get rich is called to account numerous times in the New Testament.

==== Catholicism ====
The Catholic Church holds the position that there is no moral impediment to gambling, so long as it is fair, all bettors have a reasonable chance of winning, there is no fraud involved, and the parties involved do not have actual knowledge of the outcome of the bet (unless they have disclosed this knowledge), and as long as the following conditions are met: the gambler can afford to lose the bet, and stops when the limit is reached, and the motivation is entertainment and not personal gain leading to the "love of money" or making a living. In general, Catholic bishops have opposed casino gambling on the grounds that it too often tempts people into problem gambling or addiction, and has particularly negative effects on poor people; they sometimes also cite secondary effects such as increases in loan sharking, prostitution, corruption, and general public immorality. Some parish pastors have also opposed casinos for the additional reason that they would take customers away from church bingo and annual festivals where games such as blackjack, roulette, craps, and poker are used for fundraising. St. Thomas Aquinas wrote that gambling should be especially forbidden where the losing bettor is underage or otherwise not able to consent to the transaction. Gambling has often been seen as having social consequences, as satirized by Balzac. For these social and religious reasons, most legal jurisdictions limit gambling, as advocated by Pascal.

==== Protestantism ====
Gambling views among Protestants vary, with some either discouraging or forbidding their members from participation in gambling. Methodists, in accordance with the doctrine of outward holiness, oppose gambling which they believe is a sin that feeds on greed. Other denominations that discourage gambling are the United Methodist Church, the Free Methodist Church, the Evangelical Wesleyan Church, the Salvation Army, and the Church of the Nazarene.

Other Protestants that oppose gambling include Mennonites, Schwarzenau Brethren, Quakers, the Christian Reformed Church in North America, the Church of the Lutheran Confession, the Southern Baptist Convention, the Assemblies of God, and the Seventh-day Adventist Church.

==== Other Christian denominations ====
Other churches that oppose gambling include the Jehovah's Witnesses, The Church of Jesus Christ of Latter-day Saints, the Iglesia ni Cristo, and the Members Church of God International.

=== Islam ===
There is a consensus among the 'Ulema' (Arabic: عُـلـمـاء, Scholars (of Islam)) that gambling is haraam (Arabic: حَـرام, sinful or forbidden). In assertions made during its prohibition, Muslim jurists describe gambling as being both un-Qur'anic, and as being generally harmful to the Muslim Ummah (Arabic: أُمَّـة, Community). The Arabic terminology for gambling is Maisir.

They ask you about intoxicants and gambling. Say: 'In them both lies grave sin, though some benefit, to mankind. But their sin is more grave than their benefit.'

— Surah Al-Baqara 2:219

In parts of the world that implement full Shari'ah, such as Aceh, punishments for Muslim gamblers can range up to 12 lashes or a one-year prison term and a fine for those who provide a venue for such practices. Some Islamic nations prohibit gambling; most other countries regulate it.

=== Bahá'í Faith ===
According to the Most Holy Book, paragraph 155, gambling is forbidden.

== Types ==
=== Casino games ===
While almost any game can be played for money, and any game typically played for money can also be played just for fun, some games are generally offered in a casino setting.

==== Table games ====
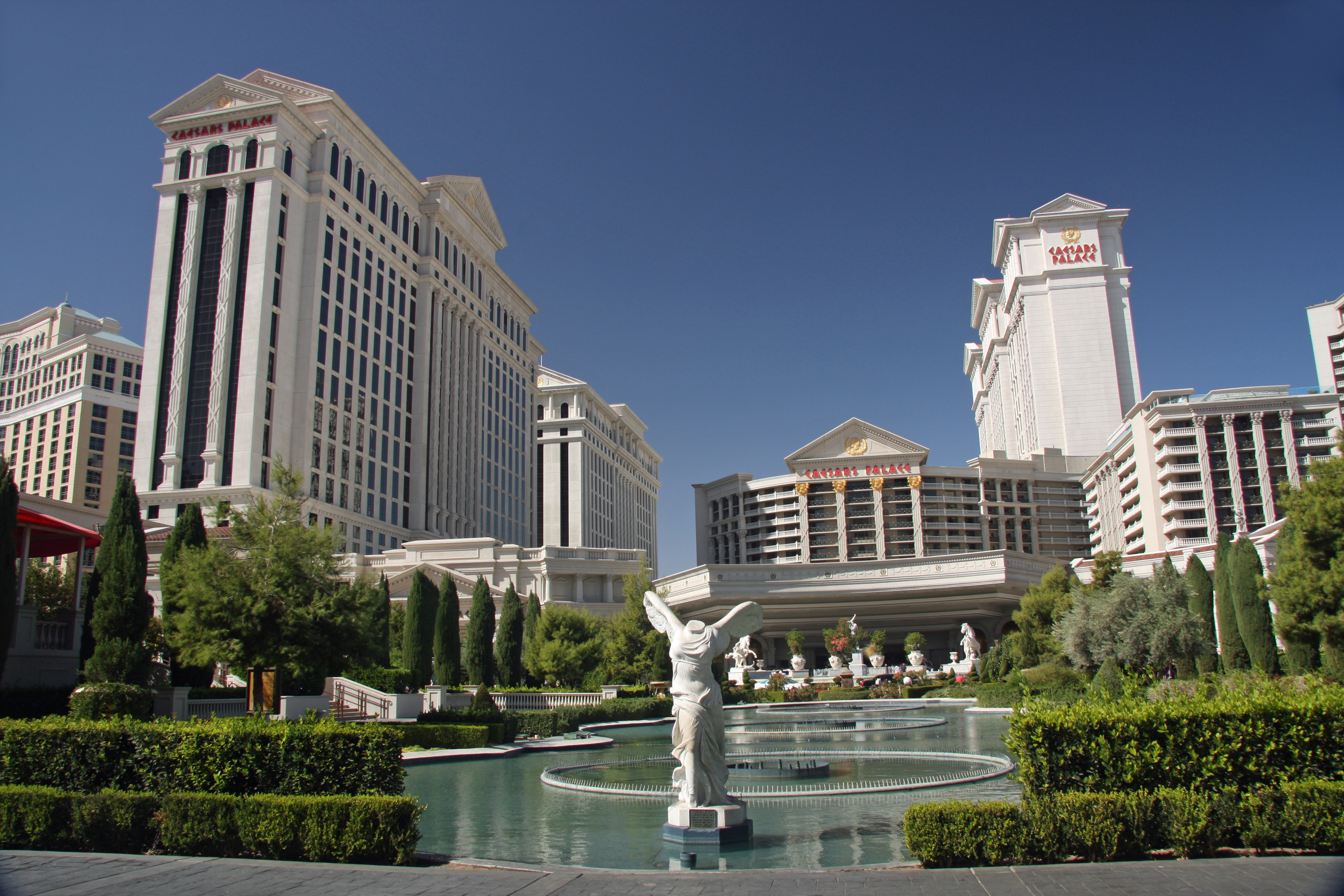
The Caesars Palace main fountain. The statue is a copy of the ancient Winged Victory of Samothrace.

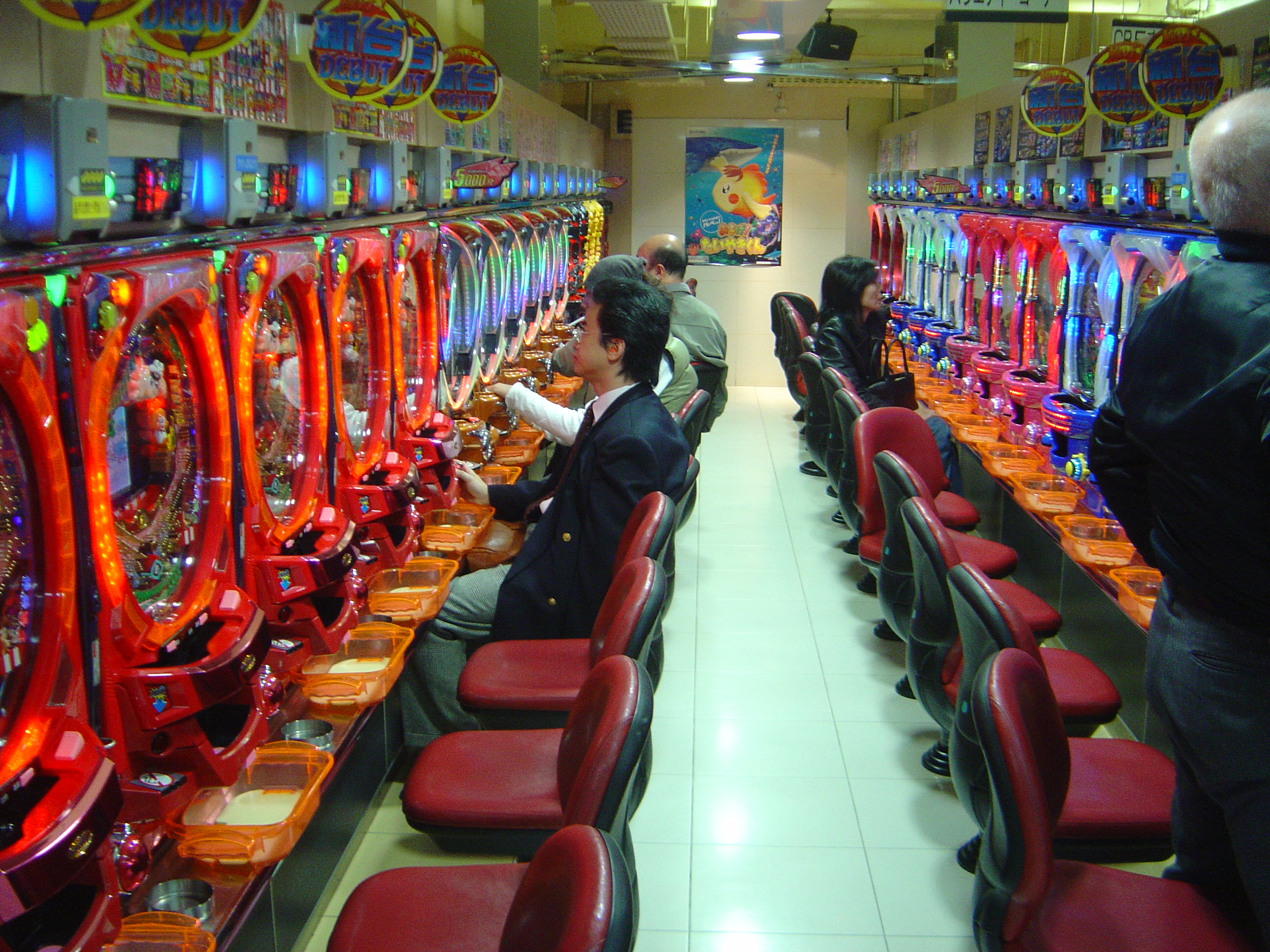
A pachinko parlor in Tokyo, Japan

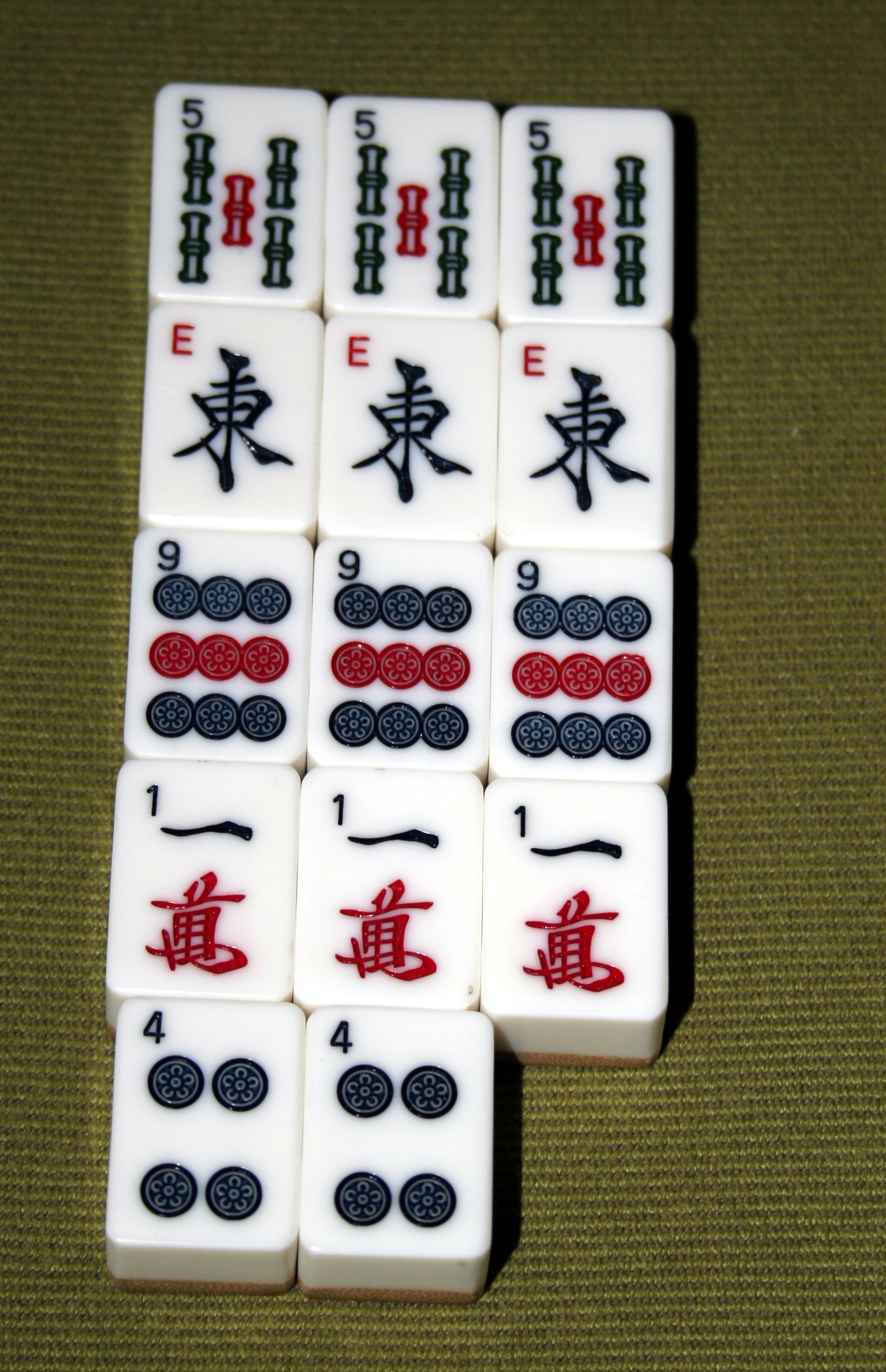
Mahjong tiles

==== Electronic gambling ====
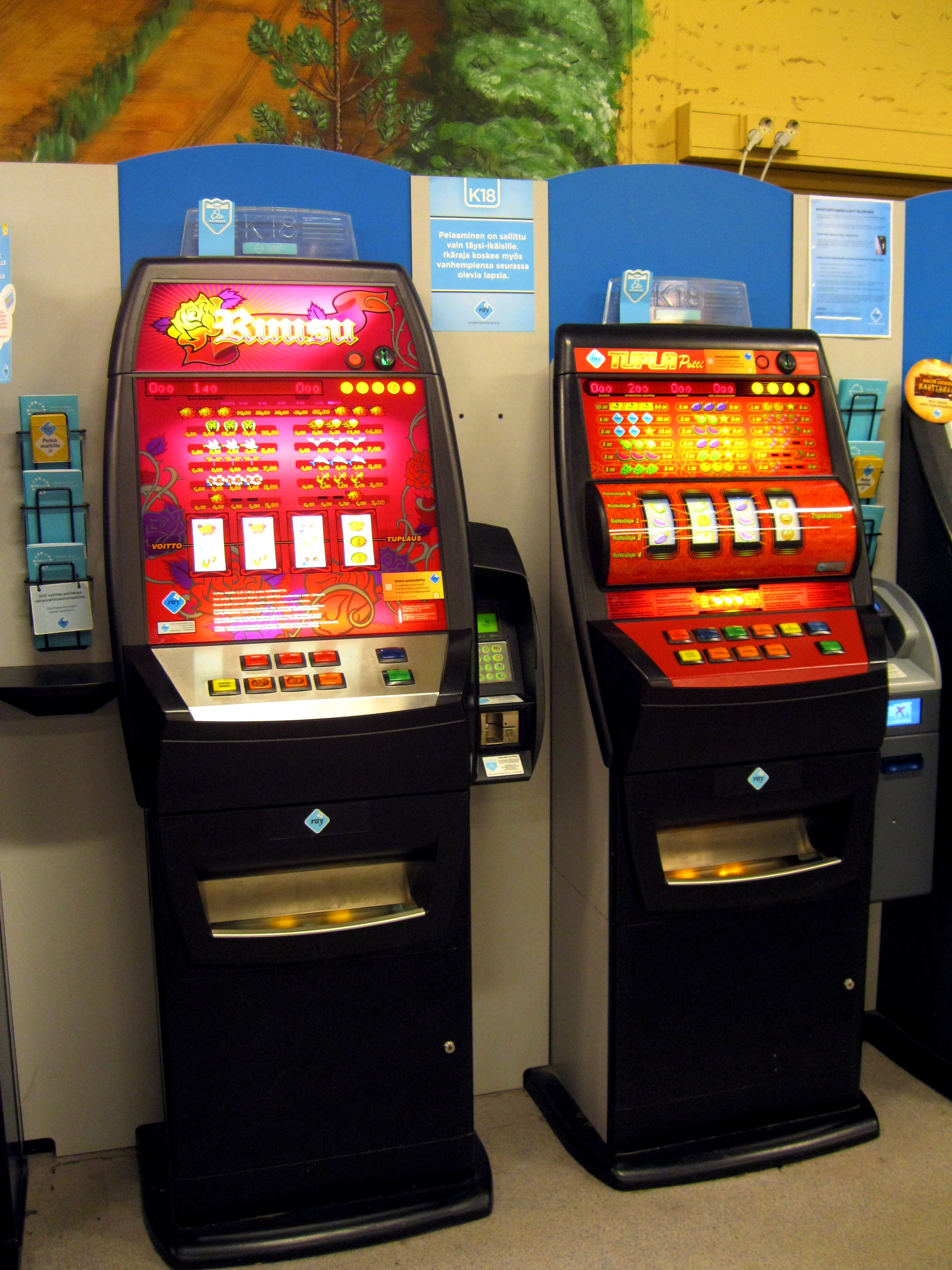
RAY's Ruusu and Tuplapotti slot machines in Finland

- Online roulette
- Pachinko
- Sic Bo
- Slot machine
- Video poker
- Video bingo

==== Other gambling ====
- Bingo
- Keno

=== Non-casino games ===
Gambling games that take place outside of casinos include bingo (as played in the US and UK), dead pool, lotteries, pull-tab games and scratchcards, and Mahjong.

Other non-casino gambling games include:

- Non-casino card games, including historical games like Basset, Ecarté, Lansquenet and Put. Technically, a gambling card game is one in which the cards are not actually played but simply bet on.
- Carnival Games such as The Razzle or Hanky Pank
- Coin-tossing games such as Head and Tail, Two-up^{†}
- Confidence tricks such as Three-card Monte or the Shell game
- Dice-based games, such as Backgammon, Liar's dice, Passe-dix, Hazard, Threes, Pig, or Mexico (or Perudo);

† Although coin tossing is not usually played in a casino, it has been known to be an official gambling game in some Australian casinos.

=== Fixed-odds betting ===
Fixed-odds betting and Parimutuel betting frequently occur at many types of sporting events, and political elections. In addition many bookmakers offer fixed odds on a number of non-sports related outcomes, for example the direction and extent of movement of various financial indices, the winner of television competitions such as Big Brother, and election results. Interactive prediction markets also offer trading on these outcomes, with "shares" of results trading on an open market.

==== Parimutuel betting ====
One of the most widespread forms of gambling involves betting on horse or greyhound racing. Wagering may take place through parimutuel pools, or bookmakers may take bets personally. Parimutuel wagers pay off at prices determined by support in the wagering pools, while bookmakers pay off either at the odds offered at the time of accepting the bet; or at the median odds offered by track bookmakers at the time the race started.

==== Sports betting ====
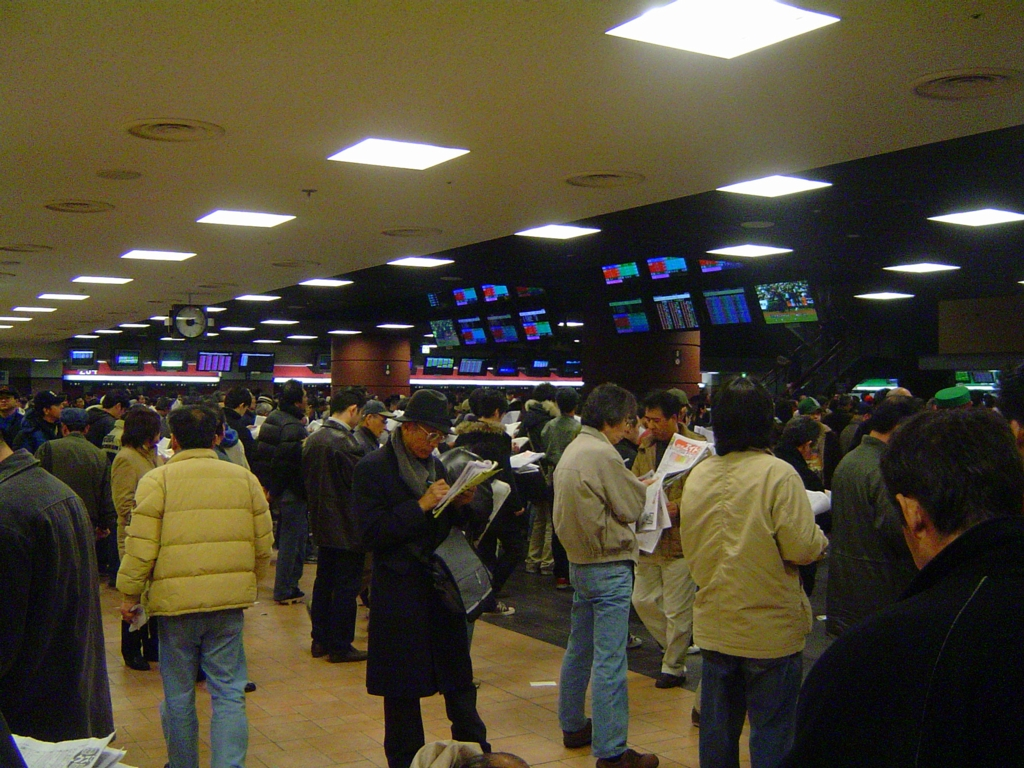
Tokyo Racecourse in Tokyo, Japan

Betting on team sports has become an important service industry in many countries. Before the advent of the internet, millions of people played the football pools every week in the United Kingdom. In addition to organized sports betting, both legal and illegal, there are many side-betting games played by casual groups of spectators, such as NCAA basketball tournament Bracket Pools, Super Bowl Squares, Fantasy Sports Leagues with monetary entry fees and winnings, and in-person spectator games like Moundball.

=== Virtual sports ===
Based on Sports Betting, Virtual Sports are fantasy and never played sports events made by software that can be played every time without wondering about external things like weather conditions.

=== Arbitrage betting ===
Arbitrage betting is a theoretically risk-free betting system in which every outcome of an event is bet upon so that a known profit will be made by the bettor upon completion of the event regardless of the outcome. Arbitrage betting is a combination of the ancient art of arbitrage trading and gambling, which has been made possible by the large numbers of bookmakers in the marketplace, creating occasional opportunities for arbitrage.

=== Other types of betting ===
One can also bet with another person that a statement is true or false, or that a specified event will happen (a "back bet") or will not happen (a "lay bet") within a specified time. This occurs in particular when two people have opposing but strongly held views on truth or events. Not only do the parties hope to gain from the bet, they place the bet also to demonstrate their certainty about the issue. Some means of determining the issue at stake must exist. Sometimes the amount bet remains nominal, demonstrating the outcome as one of principle rather than of financial importance.

Betting exchanges allow consumers to both back and lay at odds of their choice. Similar in some ways to a stock exchange, a bettor may want to back a horse (hoping it will win) or lay a horse (hoping it will lose, effectively acting as bookmaker).

Spread betting allows gamblers to wager on the outcome of an event where the pay-off is based on the accuracy of the wager, rather than a simple "win or lose" outcome. For example, a wager can be based on the when a point is scored in the game in minutes and each minute away from the prediction increases or reduces the payout.

== Staking systems ==
Many betting systems have been created in an attempt to "beat the house" but no system can make a mathematically unprofitable bet in terms of expected value profitable over time. Widely used systems include:

- Card counting – Many systems exist for blackjack to keep track of the ratio of ten values to all others; when this ratio is high the player has an advantage and should increase the amount of their bets. Keeping track of cards dealt confers an advantage in other games as well.
- Due-column betting – A variation on fixed profits betting in which the bettor sets a target profit and then calculates a bet size that will make this profit, adding any losses to the target.
- Fixed profits – the stakes vary based on the odds to ensure the same profit from each winning selection.
- Fixed stakes – a traditional system of staking the same amount on each selection.
- Kelly – the optimum level to bet to maximize your future median bank level.
- Martingale – A system based on staking enough each time to recover losses from previous bet(s) until one wins.

== Other uses of the term ==
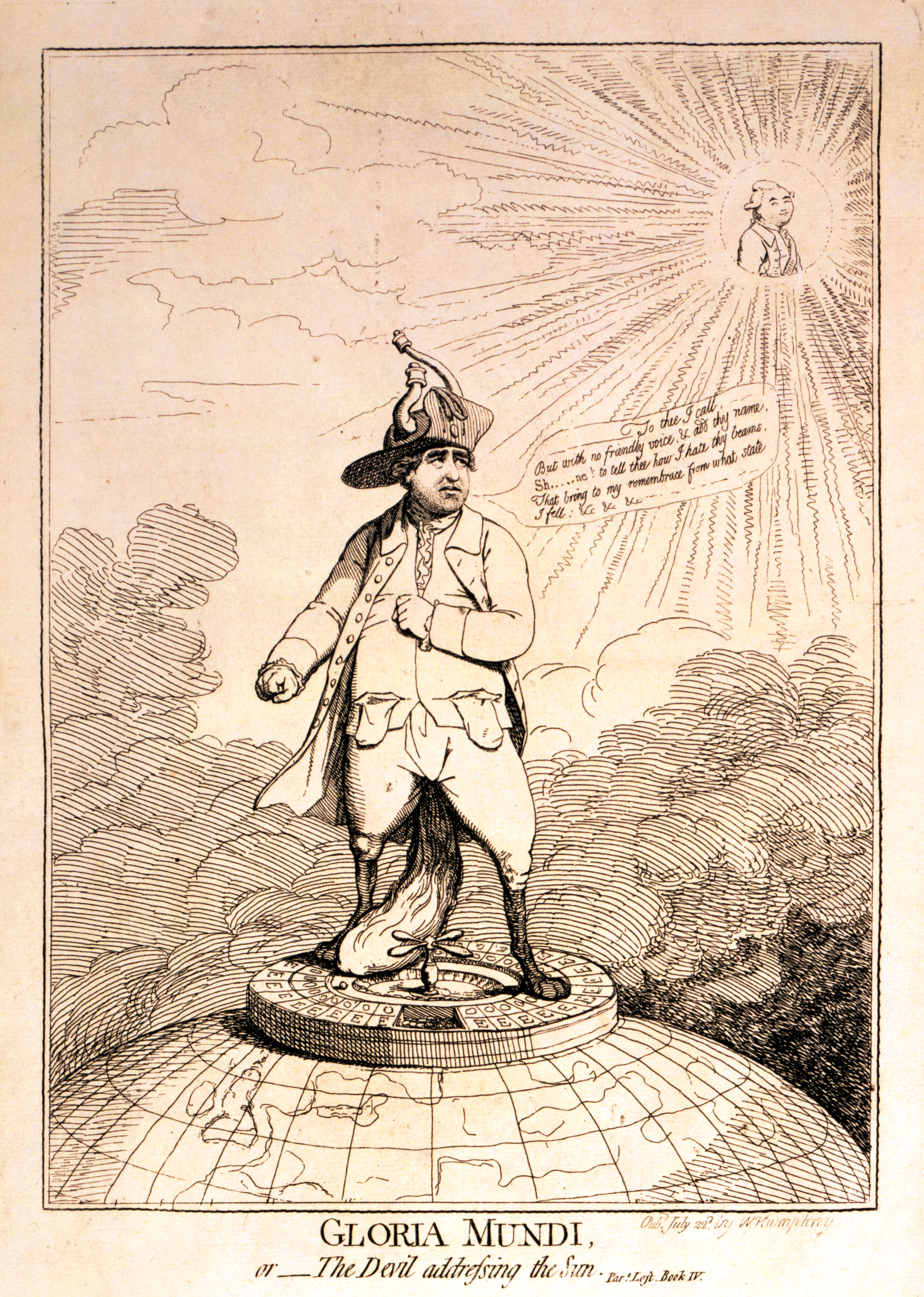
Gloria Mundi, or The Devil addressing the sun, a cartoon showing the British politician Charles James Fox standing on a roulette wheel perched atop a globe showing England and continental Europe. The implication is that his penniless state, indicated by turned-out pockets, is due to gambling.

Many risk-return choices are sometimes referred to colloquially as "gambling." Whether this terminology is acceptable is a matter of debate:

- Emotional or physical risk-taking, where the risk-return ratio is not quantifiable (e.g., skydiving, campaigning for political office, asking someone for a date, etc.)
- Insurance is a method of shifting risk from one party to another. Insurers use actuarial methods to calculate appropriate premiums, which is similar to calculating gambling odds. Insurers set their premiums to obtain a long term positive expected return in the same manner that professional gamblers select which bets to make. While insurance is sometimes distinguished from gambling by the requirement of an insurable interest, the equivalent in gambling is simply betting against one's own best interests (e.g., a sports coach betting against his own team to mitigate the financial repercussions of a losing season).
- Situations where the possible return is of secondary importance to the wager/purchase (e.g. entering a raffle in support of a charitable cause)

Investments are also usually not considered gambling, although some investments can involve significant risk. Examples of investments include stocks, bonds and real estate. Starting a business can also be considered a form of investment. Investments are generally not considered gambling when they meet the following criteria:

- Economic utility
- Positive expected returns (at least in the long term)
- Underlying value independent of the risk being undertaken

Some speculative investment activities are particularly risky, but are sometimes perceived to be different from gambling:

- Foreign currency exchange (forex) transactions
- Prediction markets
- Securities derivatives, such as options or futures, where the value of the derivative is dependent on the value of the underlying asset at a specific point in time (typically the derivative's associated expiration date)

A levant or levanting characterises the act of absconding following the outcome of a bet.

== Negative consequences ==
Problem gambling has multiple symptoms. Gamblers often play again to try to win back money they have lost, and some gamble to relieve feelings of helplessness and anxiety.

In the United Kingdom, the Advertising Standards Authority has censured several betting firms for advertisements disguised as news articles suggesting falsely that a person had cleared debts and paid for medical expenses by gambling online. The firms face possible fines.

A 2020 study of 32 countries found that the greater the amount of gambling activity in a given country, the more volatile that country's stock-market prices are. Legalization of online sports betting was found to decrease household saving, decrease investment with positive expected value and increase financial distress.

Public opinions against or for gambling varies by age.

== Psychological biases ==
Gamblers may exhibit a number of cognitive and motivational biases that distort the perceived odds of events and that influence their preferences for gambles.

- Preference for likely outcomes. When gambles are selected through a choice process – when people indicate which gamble they prefer from a set of gambles (e.g., win/lose, over/under) – people tend to prefer to bet on the outcome that is more likely to occur. Bettors tend to prefer to bet on favorites in athletic competitions, and sometimes will accept even bets on favorites when offered more favorable bets on the less likely outcome (e.g., an underdog team).
- Optimism/Desirability Bias. Gamblers also exhibit optimism, overestimating the likelihood that desired events will occur. Fans of NFL underdog teams, for example, will prefer to bet on their teams at even odds than to bet on the favorite, whether the bet is $5 or $50.
- Reluctance to bet against (hedge) desired outcomes. People are reluctant to bet against desired outcomes that are relevant to their identity. Gamblers exhibit reluctance to bet against the success of their preferred U.S. presidential candidates and Major League Baseball, National Football League, National Collegiate Athletic Association (NCAA) basketball, and NCAA hockey teams. More than 45% of NCAA fans in Studies 5 and 6, for instance, turned down a "free" real $5 bet against their team. From a psychological perspective, such a "hedge" creates an interdependence dilemma – a motivational conflict between a short-term monetary gain and the long-term benefits accrued from feelings of identification with and loyalty to a position, person, or group whom the bettor desires to succeed. In economic terms, this conflicted decision can be modeled as a trade-off between the outcome utility gained by hedging (e.g., money) and the diagnostic costs it incurs (e.g., disloyalty). People make inferences about their beliefs and identity from their behavior. If a person is uncertain about an aspect of their identity, such as the extent to which they value a candidate or team, hedging may signal to them that they are not as committed to that candidate or team as they originally believed. If the diagnostic cost of this self-signal and the resulting identity change are substantial, it may outweigh the outcome utility of hedging, and they may reject even very generous hedges.
- Ratio bias. Gamblers will prefer gambles with worse odds that are drawn from a large sample (e.g., drawing one red ball from an urn containing 89 red balls and 11 blue balls) to better odds that are drawn from a small sample (drawing one red ball from an urn containing 9 red balls and one blue ball).
- Gambler's fallacy/positive recency bias.

== See also ==
- Casino
- Faro Ladies
- Gambler's conceit
- Gambler's fallacy
- Gambler's ruin
- Gambling mathematics
- Gaming Research Center
- List of bets
- Lottery
- Mobile gambling
- Online gambling
