= Hot hand =

Cognitive bias

The hot hand (also known as the hot hand phenomenon or hot hand fallacy) is the putative tendency for an athlete to have streaks of success higher than their average performance. The concept is often applied to sports and skill-based tasks in general and originates from basketball, where a shooter is assumed to be more likely to score if their previous attempts were successful – i.e., while having the "hot hand". Researchers for many years did not find evidence for a "hot hand" in practice, dismissing it as fallacious. However, later research questioned whether the belief is indeed a fallacy. Some recent studies using modern statistical analysis have observed evidence for the "hot hand" in some sporting activities; however, other recent studies have not observed evidence of the "hot hand". Moreover, evidence suggests that only a small subset of players may show a "hot hand" and, among those who do, the magnitude (i.e., effect size) of the "hot hand" tends to be small. In addition, the hot hand may apply only to sequences of shots from the same location (e.g., free throws, three-point contest) and not to field goals.

== Development of theory ==
=== 1985 "Hot Hand in Basketball" paper ===
The fallacy was first described in a 1985 paper by Thomas Gilovich, Amos Tversky, and Robert Vallone. The "Hot Hand in Basketball" study questioned the hypothesis that basketball players have "hot hands", which the paper defined as the claim that players are more likely to make a successful shot if their previous shot was successful. The study looked at the inability of respondents to properly understand randomness and random events; much like innumeracy can impair a person's judgement of statistical information, the hot hand fallacy can lead people to form incorrect assumptions regarding random events. The three researchers provide an example in the study regarding the "coin toss"; respondents expected even short sequences of heads and tails to be approximately 50% heads and 50% tails. The study proposed two biases that are created by the kind of thought pattern applied to the coin toss: it could lead an individual to believe that the probability of heads or tails increases after a long sequence of either has occurred (known as the gambler's fallacy); or it could cause an individual to reject randomness due to a belief that a streak of either outcome is not representative of a random sample.

The first study was conducted via a questionnaire of 100 basketball fans from the colleges of Cornell and Stanford. The other looked at the individual records of players from the 1980–81 Philadelphia 76ers. The third study analyzed free-throw data and the fourth study was of a controlled shooting experiment. The reason for the different studies was to gradually eliminate external factors around the shot. For example, in the first study there is the factor of how the opposing team's defensive strategy and shot selection would interfere with the shooter. The second and third take out the element of shot selection, and the fourth eliminates the game setting and the distractions and other external factors mentioned before. The studies primarily found that the outcomes of both field goal and free throw attempts are independent of each other. In the later studies involving the controlled shooting experiment the results were the same; evidently, the researchers concluded that the sense of being "hot" does not predict hits or misses.

A 2018 study by Alon Daks, Nishant Desai, and Lisa R. Goldberg at the University of California, Berkeley, reexamined the hot-hand phenomenon using detailed shooting data from the Golden State Warriors during the 2016–2017 NBA season, including performances by Stephen Curry, Klay Thompson, and Kevin Durant. Building on a correction to the original 1985 study identified by Joshua Miller and Adam Sanjurjo, the researchers accounted for a statistical bias caused by the “law of small numbers”—a tendency for reversals to appear more likely than continuations in short sequences of data.

=== Proposed explanations ===
Gilovich offers two different explanations for why people believe hot hands exist. The first is that a person may be biased towards looking for streaks before watching a basketball game. This bias would then affect their perceptions and recollection of the game (confirmation bias). The second explanation deals with people's inability to recognize chance sequences. People expect chance sequences to alternate between the options more than they actually do. Chance sequences can seem too lumpy, and are thus dismissed as non-chance (clustering illusion).

There are many proposed explanations for why people are susceptible to the hot-hand fallacy. Alan D. Castel, and others investigated the idea that age would alter an individual's belief in the fallacy. To test this idea researchers conducted a cross-sectional study where they sampled 455 participants ranging in age from 22 to 90 years old. These participants were given a questionnaire preceded by a prompt that said in college and professional basketball games no players make 100% of their attempted shots. Then the questionnaire asked two important questions: (1) Does a basketball player have a better chance of making a shot after having just made the last two or three shots than after having missed the last two or three shots? (2) Is it important to pass the ball to someone who has just made several shots in a row?

The main interest of the questionnaire was to see if a participant answered yes to the first question, implying that they believed in the hot-hand fallacy. The results showed that participants over 70 years of age were twice as likely to believe the fallacy than adults 40–49, confirming that the older individuals relied more on heuristic-based processes. Older adults are more likely to remember positive information, making them more sensitive to gains and less to losses than younger adults.

One study looked at the root of the hot-hand fallacy as being from an inability to appropriately judge sequences. The study compiled research from dozens of behavioral and cognitive studies that examined the hot-hand and gambler's fallacies with random mechanisms and skill-generated streaks. In terms of judging random sequences the general conclusion was that people do not have a statistically correct concept of random. It concluded that human beings are built to see patterns in sensory and conceptual data of all types.

=== Reanalysis of Gilovich, Tversky, and Vallone study ===
In 2018 Miller and Sanjurjo published a new analysis of the original research of Gilovich, Tversky, and Vallone (GTV) and in contrast concluded that there is "significant evidence of streak shooting". Miller and Sanjurjo concluded that there is indeed a statistical basis for the hot hand phenomenon in the hit pattern of the Philadelphia 76ers.

GTV assumed that there is only evidence of a hot hand if the probability of a hit is higher after a streak of hits than the probability of a hit after a streak of misses. This cannot be observed in the hit pattern of the 76ers. The aforementioned probabilities are not significantly different. Therefore, GTV concluded that there is no sign of a hot hand phenomenon. However, Miller and Sanjurjo show that GTV's assumption is wrong and, in fact, the expected rate of hits after a streak of hits should be lower than the rate of hits after a streak of misses. Thus, an equal rate of hits to misses after a streak is a sign of a hot hand.

Miller and Sanjurjo stated that GTV introduced a sampling bias because they start counting after a series of hits/misses. Miller and Sanjurjo show analytically for a series of one hit (and empirically for bigger streaks) that this introduces a bias towards more misses, given that the number following samples is small enough (e.g. less than 100 for a fair coin). According to Miller and Sanjurjo: "it is incorrect to expect a consistent 50 percent (Bernoulli i.i.d.) shooter who has taken 100 shots to make half of the shots that immediately follow a streak of three hits".

=== Follow up studies ===
A 2003 study by Koehler, J. J. & Conley C. A. was conducted to examine the hot hand in professional basketball. In this study the researchers examined film from the NBA shooting contests from 1994 to 1997. Through studying the film of the contests the researchers hoped to find evidence of sequential dependency within each shooter across all shots. They also searched for sequential dependencies within each shooter per set of 25 continuous shots, and employed a variety of novel techniques for isolating hot performance. According to the hot hand a player should have very few runs and instead their hits and misses should be in clusters.

In their research there were only two players who had a significantly lower number of runs than expected by chance. No shooter had significantly more runs than would be expected by chance. About half of the shooters (12 of 23 = 52%) had fewer runs than expected, and about half (11 of 23 = 48%) had more runs than expected. The researchers also compared the shooters hits and misses. The data were more in accordance with chance than the hot hand. Through their analysis of the data the conclusion was drawn that there was nothing that supported the hot hand hypothesis.

A study reported that a belief in the hot-hand fallacy affects a player's perceptions of success.

== Recent research examining whether there is a hot hand ==
More recent research has questioned the earlier findings, instead finding support for the belief of a hot hand phenomenon.

A 2003 paper from researchers at Monash University noted that Gilovich et al. did not examine the statistical power of their own experiments. By performing power analysis on the 1985 data, the researchers concluded that even if the Philadelphia 76ers did shoot in streaks, it is highly unlikely that Gilovich, Vallone and Tversky would have discovered that fact.

A paper from October 2011 by Yaari and Eisenmann, a large dataset of more than 300,000 NBA free throws were found to show "strong evidence" for the "hot hand" phenomenon at the individual level. They analyzed all free throws taken during five regular NBA seasons from 2005 to 2010. They found that there was a significant increase in players' probabilities of hitting the second shot in a two-shot series compared to the first one. They also found that in a set of two consecutive shots, the probability of hitting the second shot is greater following a hit than following a miss on the previous one.

In November 2013, researchers at Stanford University used data from Major League Baseball and found that there was "strong evidence" that the hot hand existed in ten different statistical categories.

In 2014, a paper from three Harvard graduates presented at the Sloan Sports Analytics Conference, which used advanced statistics that for the first time could control for variables in basketball games such as the player's shot location and a defender's position, showed a "small yet significant hot-hand effect."

In 2015, an examination of the 1985 study by Joshua Miller and Adam Sanjurjo found flaws in the methodology of the 1985 study and showed that, in fact, the hot hands may exist. The researchers said that instead it may be attributable to a misapplication of statistical techniques. The authors concluded that people were right to believe that the hot hand exists in basketball.

A 2021 study, using data from NBA Three-Point Contests over the period 1986–2020, found "considerable evidence of hot hand shooting in and across individuals".

However, other recent studies have not observed evidence of the "hot hand". Moreover, evidence suggests that only a small subset of players may show a "hot hand" and, among those who do, the magnitude (i.e., effect size) of the "hot hand" tends to be small. A study reanalyzing the NBA Three-Point Contest data from Miller and Sanjurjo (2021;) found that the hot hand was limited to shots from the same location. Thus, the hot hand may apply only to sequences of shots from the same location (e.g., free throws, three-point contest) and not to field goals.

== In non-sport contexts ==
=== Consumers ===
There are places other than sport that can be affected by the hot-hand fallacy. A study conducted by Joseph Johnson et al. examined the characteristics of an individual's buying and selling behavior as it pertained to the hot hand and gambler's heuristic. Both of these occur when a consumer misunderstands random events in the market and is influenced by a belief that a small sample is able to represent the underlying process. To examine the effect of the hot hand and gambler's heuristic on the buying and selling behaviors of consumers, three hypotheses were made. Hypothesis one stated that consumers that were given stocks with positive and negative trends in earning would be more likely to buy a stock that was positive when it was first getting started but would become less likely to do so as the trend lengthened. Hypothesis two was that consumers would be more likely to sell a stock with negative earnings as the trend length initially increased but would decrease as the trend length increased more. Finally, the third hypothesis was that consumers in the buy condition show stronger preferences for the winning stock over the losing stock than consumers in the sell condition show for the losing stock over the winning stock. A consequence of the third hypothesis is that on average, consumers buy winners and sell losers.

The results of the experiment did not support the first hypothesis but did support hypotheses two and three, suggesting that the use of these heuristics is dependent on buying or selling and the length of the sequence. In summary, buyers for both short and long trends and sellers for short trends would fall under the influence of the hot-hand fallacy. The opposite would be in accordance with the gambler's fallacy which has more of an influence on longer sequences of numerical information.

=== Gambling ===
A study was conducted to examine the difference between the hot-hand and gambler's fallacy. The gambler's fallacy is the expectation of a reversal following a run of one outcome. Gambler's fallacy occurs mostly in cases in which people feel that an event is random, such as rolling a pair of dice on a craps table or spinning the roulette wheel. It is caused by the false belief that the random numbers of a small sample will balance out the way they do in large samples; this is known as the law of small numbers heuristic. The difference between this and the hot-hand fallacy is that with the hot-hand fallacy an individual expects a run to continue. There is a much larger aspect of the hot hand that relies on the individual. This relates to a person's perceived ability to predict random events, which is not possible for truly random events. The fact that people believe that they have this ability is in line with the illusion of control.

In this study, the researchers wanted to test if they could manipulate a coin toss, and counter the gambler's fallacy by having the participant focus on the person tossing the coin. In contrast, they attempted to initiate the hot-hand fallacy by centering the participant's focus on the person tossing the coin as a reason for the streak of either heads or tails. In either case the data should fall in line with sympathetic magic, whereby they feel that they can control the outcomes of random events in ways that defy the laws of physics, such as being "hot" at tossing a specific randomly determined outcome.

They tested this concept under three different conditions. The first was person focused, where the person who tossed the coin mentioned that she was tossing a lot of heads or tails. Second was a coin focus, where the person who tossed the coin mentioned that the coin was coming up with a lot of heads or tails. Finally there was a control condition in which there was nothing said by the person tossing the coin. The participants were also assigned to different groups, one in which the person flipping the coin changed and the other where the person remained the same.

The researchers found the results of this study to match their initial hypothesis that the gambler's fallacy could in fact be countered by the use of the hot hand and people's attention to the person who was actively flipping the coin. This counteraction of the gambler's fallacy only happened if the person tossing the coin remained the same. This study shed light on the idea that the gambler's and hot hand fallacies at times fight for dominance when people try to make predictions about the same event.

== See also ==
- Apophenia
- Clustering illusion
- Gambler's fallacy
- Game theory
- Poisson distribution
- Probability
- Sport psychology
- Statistical randomness
- Survivorship bias
- Winning streak (sports)
