= Inverse gambler's fallacy =

Formal fallacy of Bayesian inference

The inverse gambler's fallacy, named by philosopher Ian Hacking, is a formal fallacy of Bayesian inference which is an inverse of the better known gambler's fallacy. It is the fallacy of concluding, on the basis of an unlikely outcome of a random process, that the process is likely to have occurred many times before. For example, if one observes a pair of fair dice being rolled and turning up double sixes, it is wrong to suppose that this lends any support to the hypothesis that the dice have been rolled many times before. We can see this from the Bayesian update rule: letting U denote the unlikely outcome of the random process and M the proposition that the process has occurred many times before, we have

$$P(M|U) = P(M) \frac{P(U|M)}{P(U)}$$

and since P(U|M) = P(U) (the outcome of the process is unaffected by previous occurrences), it follows that P(M|U) = P(M); that is, our confidence in M should be unchanged when we learn U.

== Real-world examples ==
The inverse gambler's fallacy is unquestionably a fallacy, but there is disagreement over whether and where it has been committed in practice. In his original paper, Hacking takes as his main example a certain response to the argument from design. The argument from design asserts, first, that the universe is fine tuned to support life, and second, that this fine tuning points to the existence of an intelligent designer. The rebuttal attacked by Hacking consists of accepting the first premise, but rejecting the second on the grounds that our (big bang) universe is just one in a long sequence of universes, and that the fine tuning merely shows that there have been many other (poorly tuned) universes preceding this one. Hacking draws a sharp distinction between this argument and the argument that all possible worlds coexist in some non-temporal sense. He proposes that these arguments, often treated as minor variations of one another, should be considered fundamentally different because one is formally invalid while the other is not.

A rebuttal paper by John Leslie points out a difference between the observation of double sixes and the observation of fine tuning, namely that the former is not necessary (the roll could have come out different) while the latter is necessary (our universe must support life, which means ex hypothesi that we must see fine tuning). He suggests the following analogy: instead of being summoned into a room to observe a particular roll of the dice, we are told that we will be summoned into the room immediately after a roll of double sixes. In this situation it may be quite reasonable, upon being summoned, to conclude with high confidence that we are not seeing the first roll. In particular, if we know that the dice are fair and that the rolling would not have been stopped before double sixes turned up, then the probability that we are seeing the first roll is at most 1/36. However, the probability will be 1 if the roller has control over the outcome using omnipotence and omniscience which believers attribute to the creator. But if the roller doesn't have such powers, the probability may even be less than 1/36 because we have not assumed that the roller is obliged to summon us the first time double sixes come up.

In 2009, Daniel M. Oppenheimer and Benoît Monin published empirical evidence for the Inverse gambler's fallacy (they called it the retrospective gambler's fallacy). They found that people believe a longer sequence of random events had happened (e.g., coin toss, die roll) before an event perceived to be unrepresentative of the randomness of the generation process (a streak of heads or tails, double-six) than representative events. This fallacy extends to more real-life events such as getting pregnant, getting a hole in one, etc.

== See also ==
- Gambler's fallacy
- Gambler's conceit
