= Gambling bot =

Software that speeds up placing bets

Gambling bots are software which use a gambling website's application programming interface (API) to speed up the process of placing bets based upon a gambling system or betting strategy to decide which bets to place.

Gambling bots are disliked by many professional gamblers, as a human player obviously cannot compete, as a bot is directly linked to the site and processes odds faster than any human player. In addition, bots never get nervous or suffer from misgivings about their bets and thus achieve results efficiently and in short periods of time. On the downside, these applications could very well lose very quickly if set up incorrectly or minor mistakes are made in coding. In the beginning, humans were better at the nuances, such as bluffing, and could easily beat the bots. However, in recent years, advancement in artificial intelligence has been significant enough to oppose human game.
