= Law of averages =

Fallacy in probability

The law of averages is the commonly held belief that a particular outcome or event will, over certain periods of time, occur at a frequency that is similar to its probability. Depending on context or application it can be considered a valid common-sense observation or a misunderstanding of probability. This notion can lead to the gambler's fallacy when one becomes convinced that a particular outcome must come soon simply because it has not occurred recently (e.g. believing that because three consecutive coin flips yielded heads, the next coin flip must be virtually guaranteed to be tails).

As invoked in everyday life, the "law" usually reflects wishful thinking or a poor understanding of statistics rather than any mathematical principle. While there is a real theorem, the law of large numbers, that a random variable will reflect its underlying probability over a very large sample, the law of averages typically assumes that an unnatural short-term "balance" must occur. Typical applications also generally assume no bias in the underlying probability distribution, which is frequently at odds with the empirical evidence.

== Examples ==
=== Gambler's fallacy ===
The gambler's fallacy is a particular misapplication of the law of averages in which the gambler believes that a particular outcome is more likely because it has not happened recently, or (conversely) that because a particular outcome has recently occurred, it will be less likely in the immediate future.

As an example, consider a roulette wheel that has landed on red in three consecutive spins. An onlooker might apply the law of averages to conclude that on its next spin it is guaranteed (or at least is much more likely) to land on black. Of course, the wheel has no memory and its probabilities do not change according to past results. So even if the wheel has landed on red in ten or a hundred consecutive spins, the probability that the next spin will be black is still no more than 48.6%, assuming a fair European wheel with only one green zero. (It would be exactly 50% if there were no green zero and the wheel were fair, and 47.4% for a fair American wheel with one green "0" and one green "00".) Similarly, there is no statistical basis for the belief that lottery numbers which haven't appeared recently are due to appear soon. (There is some value in choosing lottery numbers that are, in general, less popular than others — not because they are any more or less likely to come up, but because the largest prizes are usually shared among all of the people who chose the winning numbers. The unpopular numbers are just as likely to come up as the popular numbers are, and in the event of a big win, one would likely have to share it with fewer other people. See parimutuel betting.)

=== Expectation values ===
Another application of the law of averages is a belief that a sample's behaviour must line up with the expected value based on population statistics. For example, suppose a fair coin is flipped 100 times. Using the law of averages, one might predict that there will be 50 heads and 50 tails. While this is the single most likely outcome, there is only an 8% chance of it occurring according to $P(X = 50 \mid n = 100, p = 0.5)$ of the binomial distribution. Predictions based on the law of averages are even less useful if the sample does not reflect the population.

=== Repetition of trials ===
In this example, one tries to increase the probability of a rare event occurring at least once by carrying out more trials. For example, a job seeker might argue, "If I send my résumé to enough places, the law of averages says that someone will eventually hire me." Assuming a non-zero probability, it is true that conducting more trials increases the overall likelihood of the desired outcome. However, there is no particular number of trials that guarantees that outcome; rather, the probability that it will already have occurred approaches but never quite reaches 100%.

=== Chicago Cubs ===
The Steve Goodman song "A Dying Cub Fan's Last Request" mentions the law of averages in reference to the Chicago Cubs lack of championship success. At the time Goodman recorded the song in 1981, the Cubs had not won a National League championship since 1945, and had not won a World Series since 1908. This futility would continue until the Cubs would finally win both in 2016.

== See also ==
- Law of large numbers
- Gambler's fallacy
- Regression toward the mean
