= Table limit =

Minimum and maximum bet at a gaming table

The table limit is the minimum and maximum bet that a gambler can make at a gaming table. It is a form of yield management in that the limits can be changed to optimize the profit from a gaming table. Gaming tables have limited resources to sell: the seats used by the players.

== Minimum table limits ==
Table limits can also be used to manage, in a limited manner, who plays at tables. A casino that wants to project a more exclusive image can set the limits higher so that the casual player walking through would not be as likely to sit down and play. Also games with a lower house edge often have a higher minimum bet. Baccarat almost always has a high minimum bet since the house edge is relatively low. Often a casino will advertise a low minimum game as a teaser, a sign might read $2 blackjack 24 hours a day. However, the $2 minimum game might be available at only one table and the payout might be 6:5 for a blackjack.

Historically the attitude has changed about table limits. In the early 1990s in downtown Vegas, quarter minimum bets were common. The low minimums created a general excitement in the casinos as hundreds of people would jostle to play table games. However, casinos floors generally had twice as many employees as they do today. It also made it much easier to introduce new gamblers to table games. Most casinos today would prefer that the low rollers play slot machines which do not require as much oversight.

Normally the limits are set to optimize the return from the seats. Since all table games give the house an advantage, the larger the bets, the larger the house's profit, so the house needs to manage the minimum bets to keep the seats full. This usually results in a low limit early in the day when there are fewer players with the limits increasing as more players become available.

Players who are seated when the limit is changed are usually grandfathered in at the old limit. In some casinos they retain the old limit until they leave, in others the lower limit will last for a limited period of time.

Casinos are increasingly turning towards expensive virtual gaming tables to offer low minimum table limit games to customers. Although electronic versions of table games like blackjack have been available for years, they typically raise the house edge by paying even money on blackjack to handle the very low table limits. The more expensive virtual games with high definition video simulations of real dealers pay normal 3:2 payouts, but still include some limitations like limiting the player from doubling soft combinations. Since the electronic machines are available 24/7 and do not require a paid dealer, they are popular ways to augment the gaming pit.

== High table limits ==
Table maximums can be as low as $50 at the small locals casino Poker Palace, but major strip casinos usually offer some tables with a $10,000 maximum. Exceptions are the Golden Nugget in downtown which permits $15,000 bets, and three tables at Caesars Palace which permit bets between $5,000 and $50,000.

High table limits have their own requirements. For instance as of the year ending September 2009, the 231 blackjack tables in downtown Las Vegas earn an average of $531 per day and the 36 craps table earn an average of $2258 per day in gross revenue before expenses. Although the house has a statistical edge on the expected return, the casino has no control over variance. The outcome of a small number of players making huge bets is unpredictable. The casino could make record profits, or the players could wipe out the cash in the casino or eliminate the profit for the month. Maximum table limits prevent the casino from taking too much of a gamble. For a small casino table maximums are set at $100–$500 per bet. The larger casino can afford larger maximums.

Tim Poster and Tom Breitling purchased the Golden Nugget casino in Las Vegas in January 2004. Although they personally invested $50 million of their own money in the project, they did not have the deep pockets of a major corporation. In order to create the ambiance of Old Vegas, and to attract the high rollers to the aging casino, they elected to work with lower house edges and high table limits. The strategy worked for 9 months until a high roller won $8.5 million over a two-week period and wiped out their profit for a year. The owners elected to return table limits to something less risky.

High rollers are usually handled by the largest corporations with revenues of several billion dollars a year. The corporations can handle large quarterly variations in profits. In the 21st century Las Vegas changed their policy established in 1931 that all gaming should be public. They permitted small clubs to be opened strictly for high rollers. The Paiza Club in the Palazzo hotel requires that players have at least $300,000 of credit or on front money deposit to play. Live feeds directly to the State Gaming Commission are a requirement.

A table or a game without a limit is commonly referred to as no-limit. These tables generally allow the player to bet as much as they wish. This is a common form of Texas hold 'em in tournament play where the size of the bets are limited by the chips in play or cash games where the bet is limited by the size of the 'buy in' or chips one has accumulated prior to the current hand. No-limit can be a somewhat deceptive term, however, as one may not bring more money to the table once a hand has started or place a bet for more than the total amount that one has in play when the hands starts.

There is a widely held belief that casinos instituted maximum table limits to limit Martingale betting strategies. The simplest of these strategies involves a player doubling the bet every time a loss is incurred on a bet with even odds, until the player wins. In reality casinos are not at risk from Martingale players. They are at risk against the lucky player who is betting an amount that would be proportionately high for that particular business.

The number of high and low limit tables are unique to each casino. For example, Las Vegas Neighborhood and Downtown casinos usually have lower limit tables than Strip casinos.
