= Betting strategy =

Strategy for wagering

A betting strategy (also known as betting system) is a structured approach to gambling, in the attempt to produce a profit. To be successful, the system must change the house edge into a player advantage — which is impossible for pure games of probability with fixed odds, despite many people's belief in their effectiveness. Betting systems are often predicated on statistical analysis.

Mathematically, no betting system can alter long-term expected results in a game with random, independent trials, although they can make for higher odds of short-term winning at the cost of increased risk, and are an enjoyable gambling experience for some people. Strategies which take into account the changing odds that exist in some games (e.g. card counting and handicapping), can alter long-term results.

This is formally stated by game theorist Richard Arnold Epstein in The Theory of Gambling and Statistical Logic as:

Theorem 1: If a gambler risks a finite capital over many plays in a game with constant single-trial probability of winning, losing, and tying, then any and all betting systems lead ultimately to the same value of mathematical expectation of gain per unit amount wagered.

== Examples ==
Common betting systems include:

- Card games – Card counting
- Sports – Handicapping
- Martingale
- Kelly criterion
- Split martingale
- Anti-martingale
- d'Alembert system
- Oscar's grind

=== Horse racing ===
Some horse racing betting systems can be based on pure statistical analysis of the odds, while others also analyze physical factors (e.g. the horses' form, jockey form and lane draw). Common forms of betting systems for horse racing are:

- hedging - betting on multiple outcomes in a race
- arbitrage - lay the horse a low price and back it at a high price.

== See also ==
- Gambler's fallacy
- House edge
- Mathematics of bookmaking
- Parimutuel betting
