= Gaming Research Center =

The Gambling Research Center (Universität Hohenheim) examines the various aspects of gaming and gambling through an interdisciplinary scientific approach. The goal of the Center is to systematically and scientifically examine the wide range of topics relating to gaming and gambling such as lotteries, sports betting, card games and gaming machines.

== History ==
The Gambling Research Center was founded at the Universität Hohenheim in 2004 with Prof. Dr. Tilman Becker acting as its head. Scientists whose main interests concern games of chance may join the scientific management board of the research center.

== Goals ==
The Gambling Research Center aims at scientifically examining all topics relating to gaming and gambling from an interdisciplinary, in particular economic, mathematic, social, medical, psychological, and legal point of view.

== Symposiums ==
Every year, representatives from academia and business gather to discuss current trends in, and aspects of the topic of gambling and gaming. The legal and regulatory aspects play just as large a role as addiction prevention and the economic impacts of gambling. About 200 representatives from all fields, including psychology and medicine, participate in the one- to two-day conference at the Universität Hohenheim.

== Presentations ==
- "Recent Developments in German Gambling Law", Vortrag auf der Tagung „Gambling Regulation in Europe“ der Universitäten Leuven und Tilburg, Leuven, 10. November 2009
- "The Future of Lotteries: Prediction Markets", Vortrag auf der 7th European Conference on Gambling Studies and Policy Issues der European Association for the Study of Gambling, Nova Gorica, Slowenien, 2. July 2008

== Publication Series ==
- An Ecological Approach to Electronic Gambling Machines and Socioeconomic Deprivation in Germany

Xouridas, S., Jasny, J., Becker, T, in: Journal of Gambling Issues

- Glücksspiel im Internet: Beiträge zum Symposium 2009 der Forschungsstelle Glücksspiel. Schriftenreihe zur Glücksspielforschung Band 6; Becker T. (Hrsg.); Peter Lang Verlag, Frankfurt am Main 2011
- Werbung für Produkte mit einem Suchtgefährdungspotential: Tabak-, Alkohol- und Glücksspielwerbung aus rechtlicher, ökonomischer und psychologischer Sicht. Schriftenreihe zur Glücksspielforschung Band 5; Becker T., Peter Lang Verlag, Frankfurt am Main 2010
- Glücksspielsucht in Deutschland – Prävalenz bei verschiedenen Glücksspielformen. Schriftenreihe zur Glücksspielforschung Band 4; Becker, T. (Hrsg.); Peter Lang Verlag, Frankfurt am Main 2009
- Der Staatsvertrag zum Glücksspielwesen und dessen Umsetzung: Beiträge zum Symposium 2007 und 2008 der Forschungsstelle Glücksspiel. Schriftenreihe zur Glücksspielforschung Band 3; Becker, T. (Hrsg.); Peter Lang Verlag, Frankfurt am Main 2009
- Glücksspiel im Umbruch: Beiträge zum Symposium 2006 der Forschungsstelle Glücksspiel. Schriftenreihe zur Glücksspielforschung Band 2; Becker, T., Baumann, C. (Hrsg.); Peter Lang Verlag, Frankfurt am Main 2007
- Gesellschafts- und Glücksspiel: Staatliche Regulierung und Suchtprävention. Schriftenreihe zur Glücksspielforschung Band 1; Becker, T., Baumann, C. (Hrsg.); Peter Lang Verlag, Frankfurt am Main 2006

== Series ==
Series for gambling research (each appeared in Peter Lang Verlag, Frankfurt am Main)

- Zwischenevaluierung des Glücksspielstaatsvertrags: Beiträge zu den Symposien 2014 und 2015 der Forschungsstelle Glücksspiel. Band 16; Becker, T. (Hrsg.); 2016
- Verfügbarkeit und Sucht beim Automatenspiel. Band 15; Becker, T.; 2015
- Verhinderung von Sportwettmanipulationen und Autonomie des Sports. Schriftenreihe zur Glücksspielforschung Band 14; Weinbuch, C.; Peter Lang Verlag, Frankfurt am Main 2015
- Sucht-, Betrugs- und Kriminalitätsgefährdungspotential von Glücksspielen: Beiträge zum Symposium 2013 der Forschungsstelle Glücksspiel. Band 13; Becker, T. (Hrsg.); 2015
- Der neue Glücksspielstaatsvertrag: Beiträge zum Symposium 2012 der Forschungsstelle Glücksspiel. Band 12; Becker, T. (Hrsg.); 2014
- Abbruch der Zahlungsströme als Mittel zur Bekämpfung unerlaubter Internetglücksspiele. Band 11; Brugger, C.; 2013
- Neueste Entwicklungen zum Glücksspielstaatsvertrag: Beiträge zum Symposium 2011 der Forschungsstelle Glücksspiel. Band 10; Becker, T. (Hrsg.); 2012
- Jugendliche und glücksspielbezogene Probleme - Risikobedingungen, Entwicklungsmodelle und Implikationen für präventive Handlungsstrategien. Band 9; Hayer, T.; 2012
- Zwischenbilanz zum Glücksspielstaatsvertrag für Lotterien und Sportwetten: Beiträge zum Symposium 2010 der Forschungsstelle Glücksspiel. Band 8; Becker, T. (Hrsg.); 2011
- Soziale Kosten des Glücksspiels in Deutschland. Band 7; Becker, T.; 2011
- Glücksspiel im Internet: Beiträge zum Symposium 2009 der Forschungsstelle Glücksspiel. Band 6; Becker T. (Hrsg.); 2011
- Werbung für Produkte mit einem Suchtgefährdungspotential: Tabak-, Alkohol- und Glücksspielwerbung aus rechtlicher, ökonomischer und psychologischer Sicht. Band 5; Becker T., 2010
- Glücksspielsucht in Deutschland - Prävalenz bei verschiedenen Glücksspielformen. Band 4; Becker, T. (Hrsg.); 2009
- Der Staatsvertrag zum Glücksspielwesen und dessen Umsetzung: Beiträge zum Symposium 2007 und 2008 der Forschungsstelle Glücksspiel. Band 3; Becker, T. (Hrsg.); 2009
- Glücksspiel im Umbruch: Beiträge zum Symposium 2006 der Forschungsstelle Glücksspiel. Band 2; Becker, T., Baumann, C. (Hrsg.); 2007

Gesellschafts- und Glücksspiel: Staatliche Regulierung und Suchtprävention. Band 1; Becker, T., Baumann, C. (Hrsg.); 2006
