= Labouchère system =

Gambling strategy

The Labouchère system, also called the cancellation system or split martingale, is a gambling strategy used in roulette. The user of such a strategy decides before playing how much money they want to win, and writes down a list of positive numbers that sum to the predetermined amount. With each bet, the player stakes an amount equal to the sum of the first and last numbers on the list. If only one number remains, that number is the amount of the stake. If the bet is successful, the two amounts are removed from the list. If the bet is unsuccessful, the amount lost is appended to the end of the list. This process continues until either the list is completely crossed out, at which point the desired amount of money has been won, or until the player runs out of money to wager. The system is named for British politician and journalist Henry Labouchère, who originally devised the strategy.

== Description of the gameplay ==
The theory behind this Labouchère system is that, because the player is crossing two numbers off of the list (win) for every number added (loss) the player can complete the list, (crossing out all numbers) thereby winning the desired amount even though the player does not need to win as much as expected for this to occur.

The Labouchère System is meant to be applied to even money Roulette propositions such as Even/Odd, Red/Black or 1–18/19–36. When any of these bets are made in the game of Roulette, a spin resulting in a "0" or "00" results in a loss, so even though the payout is even money, the odds are clearly not 50/50. The Labouchère System attempts to offset these odds.

If a player were to play any one of the above propositions, there are eighteen individual results which result in a win for that player and (for an American Roulette wheel) twenty individual results that result in a loss for that player. The player has an 18/38 chance of success betting any of the above propositions, which is around 47.37%.

Theoretically, because the player is cancelling out two numbers on the list for every win and adding only one number for every loss, the player needs to have his proposition come at least 33.34% to eventually complete the list. For example, if the list starts with seven numbers and the player wins five times and loses three (62.5% winning percentage) the list is completed and the player wins the desired amount, if the list starts with seven numbers and the player wins 43,600 times and loses 87,193 times (33.34% winning percentage) the list completes and the player wins.

A formula to understand this is as follows:

Where x = Number of wins
y = Number of losses
z = Numbers originally on the list

When

(y + z) / 2 ≤ x

The result is the list being completed.

Assuming a player bets nothing but black (red/black proposition) and black can be expected to hit 47.37% of the time, but the system only requires that it hit 33.34% of the time, it can be said that black only need hit approximately 70.38% of the time (33.34/47.37) it can generally be expected to in order for the system to prevail.

An obvious downfall to the system is bankroll, because the more losses sustained by the player, the greater the amount being bet on each turn (as well as the greater the amount lost overall) is. Consider the following list:

10 10 20 20 20 10 10

If a player were to bet black and lose four times in a row, the amounts bet would be: $20, $30, $40, and $50. By taking these four consecutive losses, the player has already lost $140 and is betting $60 more on the next bet. Consecutive losses, or an inordinate number of losses to wins can also cause table limits to come into play.

Occasionally, a player following this system will come to a point where he can no longer make the next bet as demanded by the system due to table limits. One work-around for this problem is simply to move to a higher limit table, or a player can take the next number that should be bet, divide it by two and simply add it to the list twice. The problem with the latter option is that every time a player commits such a play, it will infinitesimally increase the percentage of spins a player must win to complete the system. The reason this is so is because the player is adding two numbers (which both will be crossed out in the event of wins) where only one loss was sustained.

To prove this, if a player were to play the Labouchère system the same way with the exception being that the player always added half of the wager lost to the bottom of the list twice for every wager lost where:

x = Number of wins
y = Number of losses
z = Numbers originally on the list

When:

y + (z / 2) ≤ x

The result is the list being completed.

The player would actually have to win in excess of 50% of the time (the actual percentage of wins necessary, given x and y, being dependent on z) in order to complete the list, or more than the player could actually be expected to win.

== Algorithm ==
The algorithm for the Labouchère system can be considered a Las Vegas algorithm since the amount of money a player desires to win will always be a predetermined amount. However, there is no guarantee that the player will reach the desired goal before the bankroll is lost. This is referred to as risk of ruin. For instance, consider the recursive implementation of a round of Labouchère betting in Python.

def gamble(sequence, balance):
    """Labouchère betting."""
    # Won
    if len(sequence) < 1:
        return balance

    # If the sequence is of length 1, the bet is the number in the sequence.
    # Otherwise, it is the first number added to the last number.
    if len(sequence) == 1:
        bet = sequence[0]
    else:
        bet = sequence[0] + sequence[-1]

    # Lost the entire round
    if bet > balance:
        return balance

    won = flip_coin()

    if won:
        # Won
        return gamble(sequence[1:-1], balance + bet)
    else:
        # Lost bet
        return gamble(sequence + [bet], balance - bet)

The recursion of the algorithm terminates when the sequence is empty or when the player possesses insufficient funds to continue betting. When the function is called, the size of the bet made is equal to the sum of the first and last numbers of the sequence. If the length of the sequence is one, then the bet is equal to the sole member of the sequence. If the bet is won, then the first and last members are spliced from the sequence and the next round begins. However, if the bet results in a loss, then an integer equal the size of the lost bet is appended to the sequence and the next round begins. As determined by the parameters for termination of recursion, the only cases in which the algorithm will terminate are those in which the player has either won an amount equal to the summation of the original sequence or has lost all of their available capital.

== Reverse Labouchère ==
The Labouchère system can also be played as a positive progression betting system, in which stakes grow after wins rather than after losses; this variant is known as the reverse Labouchère. The player again writes down a line of positive numbers and stakes the sum of the first and last numbers (or the single number, if only one remains). On a win, the amount just won is added to the end of the line; on a loss, the first and last numbers are crossed out. Play continues until the line is exhausted, at which point the cycle is complete and a new line may be started.

Where the ordinary Labouchère line represents how much the player wants to win, the reverse line represents the most the player can lose in a cycle: the sum of the original line is the maximum loss, because numbers are only ever removed on losses. Profits, by contrast, are unbounded in principle and depend on the player choosing to stop during a winning streak.

Because the line only grows on wins, its starting length and values, together with the table limit (or a self-imposed single-bet limit), determine how many consecutive wins a cycle can sustain and how much is won. On a table with a $500 limit, a player starting from the line "50, 50, 50, 50, 50" completes the cycle after nine consecutive wins (bets of 100, 150, 200, 250, 300, 350, 400, 450, 500) for a profit of $2,700. Starting instead from "25, 25, 25, 25, 25" allows nineteen consecutive wins before the next bet would exceed the table limit, for a profit of $5,225.

Longer starting lines risk more, since their sum is larger, but are harder to break: a line of twelve 50s is only exhausted after six consecutive losses, whereas a line of five 50s is exhausted after three. As with the original system, the reverse Labouchère does not change the house edge; a profit requires a winning streak and quitting while ahead, and the winning percentage needed to complete a cycle depends on the table limit and the initial line rather than on any fixed figure. On single-zero roulette, even-money bets carry a house edge of about 2.70%, which the La Partage and En Prison rules reduce to about 1.35%, lowering the expected loss on such bets.

The variant is often associated with Englishman Norman Leigh and his thirteen-player team, which used a cancellation system at casinos on the French Riviera in 1966, as recounted in his book Thirteen Against the Bank.
