= False precision =

Error in numerical data

False precision (also called overprecision, fake precision, misplaced precision, excess precision, and spurious precision) occurs when numerical data are presented in a manner that implies better precision than is justified; since precision is a limit to accuracy (in the ISO definition of accuracy), this often leads to overconfidence in the accuracy, named precision bias.

== Overview ==
Madsen Pirie defines the term "false precision" in a more general way: when exact numbers are used for notions that cannot be expressed in exact terms. For example, "We know that 90% of the difficulty in writing is getting started." Often false precision is abused to produce an unwarranted confidence in the claim: "our mouthwash is twice as good as our competitor's".

In science and engineering, convention dictates that unless a margin of error is explicitly stated, the number of significant figures used in the presentation of data should be limited to what is warranted by the precision of those data. For example, if an instrument can be read to tenths of a unit of measurement, results of calculations using data obtained from that instrument can only be confidently stated to the tenths place, regardless of what the raw calculation returns or whether other data used in the calculation are more accurate. Even outside these disciplines, there is a tendency to assume that all the non-zero digits of a number are meaningful; thus, providing excessive figures may lead the viewer to expect better precision than exists.

However, in contrast, it is good practice to retain more significant figures than this in the intermediate stages of a calculation, in order to avoid accumulated rounding errors.

False precision commonly arises when high-precision and low-precision data are combined, when using an electronic calculator, and in conversion of units.

== Examples ==
False precision is the gist of numerous variations of a joke which can be summarized as follows: A tour guide at a museum tells visitors that a dinosaur skeleton is 100,000,005 years old, because he was told that it was 100 million years old when he started working there 5 years ago.

If a car's speedometer indicates a speed of 60 mph, converting it to 96.56064 km/h makes it seem like the measurement was very precise, when in fact it was not. Assuming the speedometer is accurate to 1 mph, a more appropriate conversion is 97 km/h.

Measures that rely on statistical sampling, such as IQ tests, are often reported with false precision.

== See also ==
- Arithmetic underflow
- Limit of detection
- Precision bias
- Propagation of uncertainty
- Round-off error
- Rounding
- Significant figures
