= Precision bias =

Fallacy of confusing precision with accuracy

Precision bias is a form of cognitive bias in which an evaluator of information commits a logical fallacy as the result of confusing accuracy and precision. More particularly, in assessing the merits of an argument, a measurement, or a report, an observer or assessor falls prey to precision bias when they believe that greater precision implies greater accuracy (i.e., that simply because a statement is precise, it is also true).

In a decision-making context, precise information is perceived to be more accurate, weighted more heavily when forming judgements, and influences which sources of advice people seek out. The concept is also applied in reverse: advisors may use more precise figures than are warranted in order to elicit unwarranted confidence in a claim, known as false precision. The bias has been observed to affect judgement across many real-world contexts, including negotiation, legal adjudication, and medical communication.

== Experimental findings ==
Jerez-Fernandez et al. (2014) demonstrated that observers tend to read numerical precision as a reliable cue of confidence, as confident people naturally tend to use more precise figures. This tendency reflects a generally adaptive heuristic: in everyday contexts, precise figures typically do result from careful measurement, meaning that treating precision as a proxy for accuracy is a reasonable inference that occasionally misfires. In their primary study, participants rated a person who gave precise answers to factual questions (e.g. "2,611 miles") as significantly more confident than a person who gave rounded answers (e.g. "2,600 miles"), despite both estimates being equally accurate. The second study revealed precise estimates from advisors had a greater influence on participants' subsequent estimates: participants who received precise suggestions gave narrower, more confident estimates of their own. Furthermore, when asked to choose which advisor to consult in future rounds, participants systematically preferred the advisor who had given precise estimates. This preference for precise sources has implications beyond single interactions, suggesting that precision bias may shape longer-term patterns of trust and advisor selection in contexts where numerical information is routinely communicated. Jerez-Fernandez et al. noted that these findings create incentives for the deliberate use of false precision, whereby communicators adopt unnecessarily precise figures to signal expertise they may not possess.

Janiszewski and Uy (2008) revealed that the anchoring effect is influenced by precision in the context of numerical judgements. When people are given a precise anchor, their estimate deviates away from it by a smaller amount than when given a round number, even when the precise and round anchors are numerically similar. For example, a price of $4,988 produces less adjustment than a price of $5,000. The effect has also been observed in real-world settings: the study analysed 12,581 real home sales in Florida and found that houses listed at precise prices (e.g. $284,700) sold closer to their list price than houses listed at round prices (e.g. $285,000).

Research suggests that excessive precision may signal incompetence rather than knowledge in negotiations. Loschelder et al. (2016) found that while precision generally strengthens anchoring effects for amateurs, there is an inverted U-shape relationship for experts called the "too-much-precision" effect. For example, an expert negotiating over a house would find a price of $978,781.63 suspicious rather than impressive, inferring that the person making the offer lacks real market knowledge. In cases where the precise offer was provided with justification, however, the backfiring effect was reduced. This effect is explained by the attribution of competence: experts possess sufficient domain knowledge to recognise when a figure is implausibly precise, leading them to infer that the other party is bluffing rather than genuinely informed.

=== Limitations of research ===
The foundational studies by Jerez-Fernandez et al. (2014) involved relatively small samples, with 187 and 163 participants respectively, which may limit the external validity of their findings. Additionally, while precision bias has been proposed to affect judgement in legal and medical contexts, direct empirical evidence of these applications remains limited, with much of the research conducted in laboratory settings rather than real-world observations. The broader replication crisis in psychology also raises questions about the robustness of some findings in this area, though the anchoring-precision effect has been demonstrated across both laboratory and field settings, including in analysis of real housing market data.

== Applications ==
In negotiation, precise opening offers act as stronger anchors than round offers, producing smaller and more conciliatory counteroffers, as they signal that the person making the offer is knowledgeable about the true value of what is being negotiated. Mason et al. (2013) further found that precise offers reduced not only the magnitude of counteroffers but also the likelihood of counteroffers being made at all, as recipients attributed greater knowledge and legitimacy to the precise offerer.

In science communication, social media posts describing climate consequences with precise Arabic numerals were shared significantly more and perceived as more trustworthy and likely to come from an expert than equivalent posts without them, suggesting that numerical precision shapes public engagement with scientific information.

In legal contexts, the perceived confidence of eyewitnesses influences jurors' assessments of testimony credibility, and numerical precision has been identified as a cue that inflates this perceived confidence independently of actual accuracy.

In health communication, precise risk figures may discourage patients from adjusting estimates to account for personal circumstances such as family history, whereas general terms encourage more personal adjustment and may lead to different treatment decisions.

== Related biases ==
The clustering illusion and the Texas sharpshooter fallacy may both be treated as relatives of precision bias. The clustering illusion refers to the tendency to perceive meaningful patterns in random data, such as seeing a streak of heads in a coin toss as evidence of a biased coin. The Texas sharpshooter fallacy describes the error of selecting or highlighting data after the fact to fit a pattern, analogous to shooting at a barn wall and then drawing a target around the bullet holes. In these related fallacies, precision is mistakenly considered evidence of causation, when in fact the clustered information may actually be the result of randomness.

== See also ==
- Accuracy and precision
