= Gambler's fallacy =

Mistakenly drawing statistical inference from independent events

The gambler's fallacy, also known as the Monte Carlo fallacy or the fallacy of the maturity of chances, is the belief that an independent and equally probable outcome which happened less frequently than expected is more likely to happen in the future (or vice versa). The fallacy is commonly associated with gambling, where it may be mistakenly believed, for example, that the next dice roll is more likely to give '4' because there have recently been fewer '4's than expected, when in reality the probability of the next outcome being '4' is always 1/6, for each dice roll is an independent event. A challenge to human intuition is that even though regression toward the mean is a genuine phenomenon, it does not change the odds of individual random events.

The term Monte Carlo fallacy originates from an example of the phenomenon, in which the roulette wheel spun black 26 times in succession at the Monte Carlo Casino in 1913.

== Examples ==
=== Coin toss ===
Over time, the proportion of red/blue coin tosses approaches 50-50, but the gap between the red and blue counts does not tend to decrease toward zero.

The gambler's fallacy can be illustrated by considering the repeated toss of a fair coin. The outcomes in different tosses are statistically independent and the probability of getting heads on a single toss is 1/2 (one in two). The probability of getting two heads in two tosses is 1/4 (one in four) and the probability of getting three heads in three tosses is 1/8 (one in eight). In general, if A_{i} is the event where toss i of a fair coin comes up heads, then:

$$\Pr\left(\bigcap_{i=1}^n A_i\right)=\prod_{i=1}^n \Pr(A_i)={1\over2^n}$$.

If after tossing four heads in a row, the next coin toss also came up heads, it would complete a run of five successive heads. Since the probability of a run of five successive heads is 1/32 (one in thirty-two), a person might believe that the next flip would be more likely to come up tails rather than heads again. This is incorrect and is an example of the gambler's fallacy. The event "5 heads in a row" and the event "first 4 heads, then a tails" are equally likely, each having probability 1/32. Since the first four tosses turn up heads, the probability that the next toss is a head is:

$$\Pr\left(A_5|A_1 \cap A_2 \cap A_3 \cap A_4 \right)=\Pr\left(A_5\right)=\frac{1}{2}$$.

While a run of five heads has a probability of 1/32 = 0.03125 (a little over 3%), the misunderstanding lies in not realizing that this is the case only before the first coin is tossed. After the first four tosses in this example, the results are no longer unknown, so their probabilities are at that point equal to 1 (100%). The probability of a run of coin tosses of any length continuing for one more toss is always 0.5. The reasoning that a fifth toss is more likely to be tails because the previous four tosses were heads, with a run of luck in the past influencing the odds in the future, forms the basis of the fallacy.

=== Why the probability is 1/2 for a fair coin ===
If a fair coin is flipped 21 times, the probability of 21 heads is 1 in 2,097,152. The probability of flipping a head after having already flipped 20 heads in a row is 1/2. Assuming a fair coin:

- The probability of 20 heads, then 1 tail is 0.5^{20} × 0.5 = 0.5^{21}
- The probability of 20 heads, then 1 head is 0.5^{20} × 0.5 = 0.5^{21}

The probability of getting 20 heads then 1 tail, and the probability of getting 20 heads then another head are both 1 in 2,097,152. When flipping a fair coin 21 times, the outcome is equally likely to be 21 heads as 20 heads and then 1 tail. These two outcomes are equally as likely as any of the other combinations that can be obtained from 21 flips of a coin. All of the 21-flip combinations will have probabilities equal to 0.5^{21}, or 1 in 2,097,152. Assuming that a change in the probability will occur as a result of the outcome of prior flips is incorrect because every outcome of a 21-flip sequence is as likely as the other outcomes. In accordance with Bayes' theorem, the likely outcome of each flip is the probability of the fair coin, which is 1/2.

=== Other examples ===
The fallacy leads to the incorrect notion that previous failures will create an increased probability of success on subsequent attempts. For a fair 16-sided die, the probability of each outcome occurring is 1/16 (6.25%). If a win is defined as rolling a 1, the probability of a 1 occurring at least once in 16 rolls is:

$$1-\left[\frac{15}{16}\right]^{16} \,=\, 64.39\%$$

The probability of a loss on the first roll is 15/16 (93.75%). According to the fallacy, the player should have a higher chance of winning after one loss has occurred. The probability of at least one win is now:

$$1-\left[\frac{15}{16}\right]^{15} \,=\, 62.02\%$$

By losing one toss, the player's probability of winning drops by two percentage points. With 5 losses and 11 rolls remaining, the probability of winning drops to around 0.5 (50%). The probability of at least one win does not increase after a series of losses; indeed, the probability of success actually decreases, because there are fewer trials left in which to win. The probability of winning will eventually be equal to the probability of winning a single toss, which is 1/16 (6.25%) and occurs when only one toss is left.

== Reverse position ==
After a consistent tendency towards tails, a gambler may also decide that tails has become a more likely outcome. This is a rational and Bayesian conclusion, bearing in mind the possibility that the coin may not be fair; it is not a fallacy. Believing the odds to favor tails, the gambler sees no reason to change to heads. However, it is a fallacy that a sequence of trials carries a memory of past results which tend to favor or disfavor future outcomes.

The inverse gambler's fallacy described by Ian Hacking is a situation where a gambler entering a room and seeing a person rolling a double six on a pair of dice may erroneously conclude that the person must have been rolling the dice for quite a while, as they would be unlikely to get a double six on their first attempt.

== Retrospective gambler's fallacy ==
Researchers have examined whether a similar bias exists for inferences about unknown past events based upon known subsequent events, calling this the "retrospective gambler's fallacy".

An example of a retrospective gambler's fallacy would be to observe multiple successive "heads" on a coin toss and conclude from this that the previously unknown flip was "tails". Real world examples of retrospective gambler's fallacy have been argued to exist in events such as the origin of the Universe. In his book Universes, John Leslie argues that "the presence of vastly many universes very different in their characters might be our best explanation for why at least one universe has a life-permitting character". Daniel M. Oppenheimer and Benoît Monin argue that "In other words, the 'best explanation' for a low-probability event is that it is only one in a multiple of trials, which is the core intuition of the reverse gambler's fallacy." Philosophical arguments are ongoing about whether such arguments are or are not a fallacy, arguing that the occurrence of our universe says nothing about the existence of other universes or trials of universes. Three studies involving Stanford University students tested the existence of a retrospective gamblers' fallacy. All three studies concluded that people have a gamblers' fallacy retrospectively as well as to future events. The authors of all three studies concluded their findings have significant "methodological implications" but may also have "important theoretical implications" that need investigation and research, saying "[a] thorough understanding of such reasoning processes requires that we not only examine how they influence our predictions of the future, but also our perceptions of the past."

== Childbirth ==
In 1796, Pierre-Simon Laplace described in A Philosophical Essay on Probabilities the ways in which men calculated their probability of having sons: "I have seen men, ardently desirous of having a son, who could learn only with anxiety of the births of boys in the month when they expected to become fathers. Imagining that the ratio of these births to those of girls ought to be the same at the end of each month, they judged that the boys already born would render more probable the births next of girls." The expectant fathers feared that if more sons were born in the surrounding community, then they themselves would be more likely to have a daughter. This essay by Laplace is regarded as one of the earliest descriptions of the fallacy. Likewise, after having multiple children of the same sex, some parents may erroneously believe that they are due to have a child of the opposite sex.

== Monte Carlo Casino ==
An example of the gambler's fallacy occurred in a game of roulette at the Monte Carlo Casino on August 18, 1913, when the ball fell in black 26 times in a row. This was an extremely unlikely occurrence: for any given sequence of 26 spins, the probability of either red or black occurring 26 times in a row on a single zero roulette wheel is 2×(18/37)^{26} or around 1 in 68.4 million, assuming the mechanism is unbiased. Gamblers lost millions of francs betting against black, reasoning incorrectly that the streak was causing an imbalance in the randomness of the wheel, and that it had to be followed by a long streak of red.

== Non-examples ==
=== Non-independent events ===
The gambler's fallacy does not apply when the probability of different events is not independent. In such cases, the probability of future events can change based on the outcome of past events, such as the statistical permutation of events. An example is when cards are drawn from a deck without replacement. If an ace is drawn from a deck and not reinserted, the next card drawn is less likely to be an ace and more likely to be of another rank. The probability of drawing another ace, assuming that it was the first card drawn and that there are no jokers, has decreased from 4/52 (7.69%) to 3/51 (5.88%), while the probability for each other rank has increased from 4/52 (7.69%) to 4/51 (7.84%). This effect allows card counting systems to work in games such as blackjack.

=== Bias ===
In most illustrations of the gambler's fallacy and the reverse gambler's fallacy, the trial (e.g. flipping a coin) is assumed to be fair. In practice, this assumption may not hold. For example, if a coin is flipped 21 times, the probability of 21 heads with a fair coin is 1 in 2,097,152. Since this probability is so small, if it happens, it may well be that the coin is somehow biased towards landing on heads, or that it is being controlled by hidden magnets, or similar. In this case, the smart bet is "heads" because Bayesian inference from the empirical evidence — 21 heads in a row — suggests that the coin is likely to be biased toward heads. Bayesian inference can be used to show that when the long-run proportion of different outcomes is unknown but exchangeable (meaning that the random process from which the outcomes are generated may be biased but is equally likely to be biased in any direction) and that previous observations demonstrate the likely direction of the bias, the outcome which has occurred the most in the observed data is the most likely to occur again.

For example, if the a priori probability of a biased coin is say 1%, and assuming that such a biased coin would come down heads say 60% of the time, then after 21 heads the probability of a biased coin has increased to about 32%.

The opening scene of the play Rosencrantz and Guildenstern Are Dead by Tom Stoppard discusses these issues as one man continually flips heads and the other considers various possible explanations.

=== Changing probabilities ===
If external factors are allowed to change the probability of the events, the gambler's fallacy may not hold. For example, a change in the game rules might favour one player over the other, improving their win percentage. Similarly, an inexperienced player's success may decrease after opposing teams learn about and play against their weaknesses. This is another example of bias.

== Psychology ==
=== Origins ===
The gambler's fallacy arises out of a belief in a law of small numbers, leading to the erroneous belief that small samples must be representative of the larger population. According to the fallacy, streaks must eventually even out in order to be representative. Amos Tversky and Daniel Kahneman first proposed that the gambler's fallacy is a cognitive bias produced by a psychological heuristic called the representativeness heuristic, which states that people evaluate the probability of a certain event by assessing how similar it is to events they have experienced before, and how similar the events surrounding those two processes are. According to this view, "after observing a long run of red on the roulette wheel, for example, most people erroneously believe that black will result in a more representative sequence than the occurrence of an additional red", so people expect that a short run of random outcomes should share properties of a longer run, specifically in that deviations from average should balance out. When people are asked to make up a random-looking sequence of coin tosses, they tend to make sequences where the proportion of heads to tails stays closer to 0.5 in any short segment than would be predicted by chance, a phenomenon known as insensitivity to sample size. Kahneman and Tversky interpret this to mean that people believe short sequences of random events should be representative of longer ones. The representativeness heuristic is also cited behind the related phenomenon of the clustering illusion, according to which people see streaks of random events as being non-random when such streaks are actually much more likely to occur in small samples than people expect.

The gambler's fallacy can also be attributed to the mistaken belief that gambling, or even chance itself, is a fair process that can correct itself in the event of streaks, known as the just-world fallacy. Other researchers believe that belief in the fallacy may be the result of a mistaken belief in an internal locus of control. When a person believes that gambling outcomes are the result of their own skill, they may be more susceptible to the gambler's fallacy because they reject the idea that chance could overcome skill or talent.

=== Variations ===
Some researchers believe that it is possible to define two types of gambler's fallacy: type one and type two. Type one is the classic gambler's fallacy, where individuals believe that a particular outcome is due after a long streak of another outcome. Type two gambler's fallacy, as defined by Gideon Keren and Charles Lewis, occurs when a gambler underestimates how many observations are needed to detect a favorable outcome, such as watching a roulette wheel for a length of time and then betting on the numbers that appear most often. For events with a high degree of randomness, detecting a bias that will lead to a favorable outcome takes an impractically large amount of time and is very difficult, if not impossible, to do. The two types differ in that type one wrongly assumes that gambling conditions are fair and perfect, while type two assumes that the conditions are biased, and that this bias can be detected after a certain amount of time.

Another variety, known as the retrospective gambler's fallacy, occurs when individuals judge that a seemingly rare event must come from a longer sequence than a more common event does. The belief that an imaginary sequence of die rolls is more than three times as long when a set of three sixes is observed as opposed to when there are only two sixes. This effect can be observed in isolated instances, or even sequentially. Another example would involve hearing that a teenager has unprotected sex and becomes pregnant on a given night, and concluding that she has been engaging in unprotected sex for longer than if we hear she had unprotected sex but did not become pregnant, when the probability of becoming pregnant as a result of each intercourse is independent of the amount of prior intercourse.

=== Relationship to hot-hand fallacy ===
Another psychological perspective states that gambler's fallacy can be seen as the counterpart to basketball's hot-hand fallacy, in which people tend to predict the same outcome as the previous event - known as positive recency - resulting in a belief that a high scorer will continue to score. In the gambler's fallacy, people predict the opposite outcome of the previous event - negative recency - believing that since the roulette wheel has landed on black on the previous six occasions, it is due to land on red the next. Ayton and Fischer have theorized that people display positive recency for the hot-hand fallacy because the fallacy deals with human performance, and that people do not believe that an inanimate object can become "hot." Human performance is not perceived as random, and people are more likely to continue streaks when they believe that the process generating the results is nonrandom. When a person exhibits the gambler's fallacy, they are more likely to exhibit the hot-hand fallacy as well, suggesting that one construct is responsible for the two fallacies.

The difference between the two fallacies is also found in economic decision-making. A study by Huber, Kirchler, and Stockl in 2010 examined how the hot hand and the gambler's fallacy are exhibited in the financial market. The researchers gave their participants a choice: they could either bet on the outcome of a series of coin tosses, use an expert opinion to sway their decision, or choose a risk-free alternative instead for a smaller financial reward. Participants turned to the expert opinion to make their decision 24% of the time based on their past experience of success, which exemplifies the hot-hand. If the expert was correct, 78% of the participants chose the expert's opinion again, as opposed to 57% doing so when the expert was wrong. The participants also exhibited the gambler's fallacy, with their selection of either heads or tails decreasing after noticing a streak of either outcome. This experiment helped bolster Ayton and Fischer's theory that people put more faith in human performance than they do in seemingly random processes.

=== Neurophysiology ===
While the representativeness heuristic and other cognitive biases are the most commonly cited cause of the gambler's fallacy, research suggests that there may also be a neurological component. Functional magnetic resonance imaging has shown that after losing a bet or gamble, known as riskloss, the frontoparietal network of the brain is activated, resulting in more risk-taking behavior. In contrast, there is decreased activity in the amygdala, caudate, and ventral striatum after a riskloss. Activation in the amygdala is negatively correlated with gambler's fallacy, so that the more activity exhibited in the amygdala, the less likely an individual is to fall prey to the gambler's fallacy. These results suggest that gambler's fallacy relies more on the prefrontal cortex, which is responsible for executive, goal-directed processes, and less on the brain areas that control affective decision-making.

The desire to continue gambling or betting is controlled by the striatum, which supports a choice-outcome contingency learning method. The striatum processes the errors in prediction and the behavior changes accordingly. After a win, the positive behavior is reinforced and after a loss, the behavior is conditioned to be avoided. In individuals exhibiting the gambler's fallacy, this choice-outcome contingency method is impaired, and they continue to make risks after a series of losses.

=== Possible solutions ===
The gambler's fallacy is a deep-seated cognitive bias and can be very hard to overcome. Educating individuals about the nature of randomness has not always proven effective in reducing or eliminating any manifestation of the fallacy. Participants in a study by Beach and Swensson in 1967 were shown a shuffled deck of index cards with shapes on them, and were instructed to guess which shape would come next in a sequence. The experimental group of participants was informed about the nature and existence of the gambler's fallacy, and were explicitly instructed not to rely on run dependency to make their guesses. The control group was not given this information. The response styles of the two groups were similar, indicating that the experimental group still based their choices on the length of the run sequence. This led to the conclusion that instructing individuals about randomness is not sufficient in lessening the gambler's fallacy.

An individual's susceptibility to the gambler's fallacy may decrease with age. A study by Fischbein and Schnarch in 1997 administered a questionnaire to five groups: students in grades 5, 7, 9, 11, and college students specializing in teaching mathematics. None of the participants had received any prior education regarding probability. The question asked was: "Ronni flipped a coin three times and in all cases heads came up. Ronni intends to flip the coin again. What is the chance of getting heads the fourth time?" The results indicated that as the students got older, the less likely they were to answer with "smaller than the chance of getting tails", which would indicate a negative recency effect. 35% of the 5th graders, 35% of the 7th graders, and 20% of the 9th graders exhibited the negative recency effect. Only 10% of the 11th graders answered this way, and none of the college students did. Fischbein and Schnarch theorized that an individual's tendency to rely on the representativeness heuristic and other cognitive biases can be overcome with age.

Another possible solution comes from Roney and Trick, Gestalt psychologists who suggest that the fallacy may be eliminated as a result of grouping. When a future event such as a coin toss is described as part of a sequence, no matter how arbitrarily, a person will automatically consider the event as it relates to the past events, resulting in the gambler's fallacy. When a person considers every event as independent, the fallacy can be greatly reduced.

Roney and Trick told participants in their experiment that they were betting on either two blocks of six coin tosses, or on two blocks of seven coin tosses. The fourth, fifth, and sixth tosses all had the same outcome, either three heads or three tails. The seventh toss was grouped with either the end of one block, or the beginning of the next block. Participants exhibited the strongest gambler's fallacy when the seventh trial was part of the first block, directly after the sequence of three heads or tails. The researchers pointed out that the participants that did not show the gambler's fallacy showed less confidence in their bets and bet fewer times than the participants who picked with the gambler's fallacy. When the seventh trial was grouped with the second block, and was perceived as not being part of a streak, the gambler's fallacy did not occur.

Roney and Trick argued that instead of teaching individuals about the nature of randomness, the fallacy could be avoided by training people to treat each event as if it is a beginning and not a continuation of previous events. They suggested that this would prevent people from gambling when they are losing, in the mistaken hope that their chances of winning are due to increase based on an interaction with previous events.

== Users ==
=== Types of users ===
Within a real-world setting, numerous studies have uncovered that for various decision makers placed in high stakes scenarios, it is likely they will reflect some degree of strong negative autocorrelation in their judgement.

=== Casino gamblers ===
In an analysis of security-camera recordings of roulette play at a Nevada casino, gamblers became increasingly likely to bet against an outcome as a streak of that outcome lengthened, consistent with the gambler's fallacy.

==== Asylum judges ====
In a study aimed at discovering if the negative autocorrelation that exists with the gambler's fallacy existed in the decision made by U.S. asylum judges, results showed that after two successive asylum grants, a judge would be 5.5% less likely to approve a third grant.

==== Baseball umpires ====
In the game of baseball, decisions are made every minute. One particular decision made by umpires which is often subject to scrutiny is the 'strike zone' decision. Whenever a batter does not swing, the umpire must decide if the ball was within a fair region for the batter, known as the strike zone. If outside of this zone, the ball does not count towards outing the batter. In a study of over 12,000 games, results showed that umpires are 1.3% less likely to call a strike if the previous two balls were also strikes.

==== Loan officers ====
In the decision making of loan officers, it can be argued that monetary incentives are a key factor in biased decision making, rendering it harder to examine the gambler's fallacy effect. However, research shows that loan officers who are not incentivised by monetary gain are 8% less likely to approve a loan if they approved one for the previous client.

==== Lottery players ====
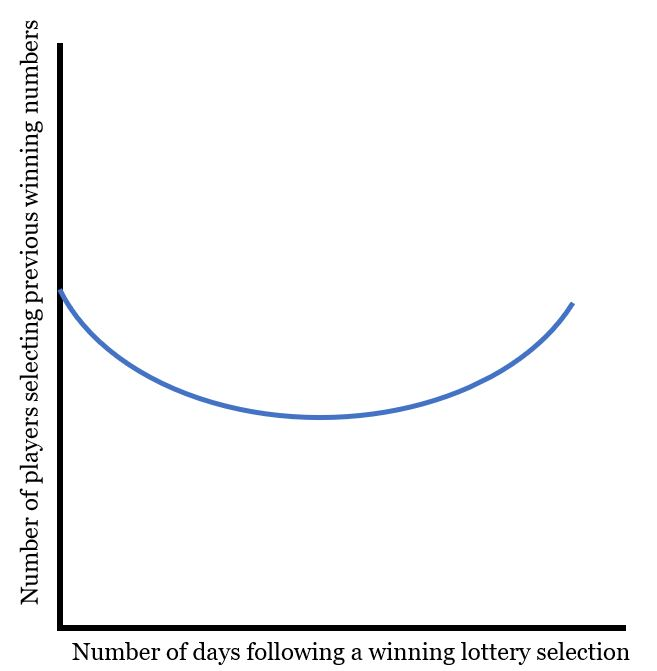
The effect of gambler's fallacy on lottery selections, based on studies by Dek Terrell. After winning numbers are drawn, lottery players respond by reducing the number of times they select those numbers in following draws. This effect slowly corrects over time, as players become less affected by the fallacy.

Lottery play and jackpots entice gamblers around the globe, with the biggest decision for hopeful winners being what numbers to pick. While most people will have their own strategy, evidence shows that after a number is selected as a winner in the current draw, the same number will experience a significant drop in selections in the following lottery. A popular study by Charles Clotfelter and Philip Cook investigated this effect in 1991, where they concluded bettors would cease to select numbers immediately after they were selected, ultimately recovering selection popularity within three months. Soon after, a 1994 study was constructed by Dek Terrell to test the findings of Clotfelter and Cook. The key change in Terrell's study was the examination of a pari-mutuel lottery in which, a number selected with lower total wagers placed on it will result in a higher pay-out. While this examination did conclude that players in both types of lotteries exhibited behaviour in-line with the gambler's fallacy theory, those who took part in pari-mutuel betting seemed to be less influenced.

Table 1. Percentage change in numbers selected by lottery players based on Clotfelter, Cook (1991)
		Amount bet by lottery players				
Numbers drawn 14 April 1988		Draw day	Days after draw			
April	Winner Numbers	0	1	3	7	56
11	244	41	34	24	27	30
12	504	29	20	12	18	15
13	718	28	20	17	19	25
14	323	134	95	79	81	76
15	640	10	20	18	16	20
16	957	30	22	20	24	32
Average percentage of players selecting previously winning numbers compared to day of draw			78%	63%	68%	73%

The effect of the gambler's fallacy can be observed as numbers are chosen far less frequently soon after they are selected as winners, recovering slowly over a two-month period. For example, on the 11th of April 1988, 41 players selected 244 as the winning combination. Three days later only 24 individuals selected 244, a 41.5% decrease. This is the gambler's fallacy in motion, as lottery players believe that the occurrence of a winning combination in previous days will decrease its likelihood of occurring today.

==== Video game players ====
Several video games feature the use of loot boxes, a collection of in-game items awarded on opening with random contents set by rarity metrics, as a monetization scheme. Since around 2018, loot boxes have come under scrutiny from governments and advocates on the basis they are akin to gambling, particularly for games aimed at youth. Some games use a special "pity-timer" mechanism, that if the player has opened several loot boxes in a row without obtaining a high-rarity item, subsequent loot boxes will improve the odds of a higher-rate item drop. This is considered to feed into the gambler's fallacy since it reinforces the idea that a player will eventually obtain a high-rarity item (a win) after only receiving common items from a string of previous loot boxes.

== See also ==
- Availability heuristic
- Gambler's conceit
- Gambler's ruin
- Infinite monkey theorem
- Inverse gambler's fallacy
- Hot hand fallacy
- Law of averages
- Martingale (betting system)
- Mean reversion (finance)
- Memorylessness
- Oscar's grind
- Regression toward the mean
- Statistical regularity
- Problem gambling
