= Clustering illusion =

Erroneously seeing patterns in randomness

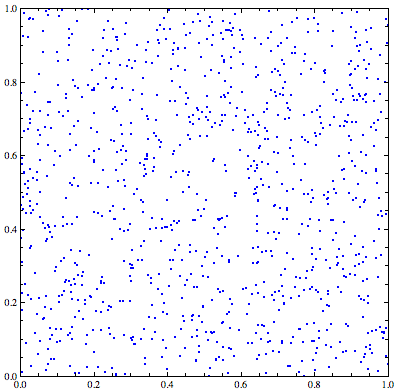
1,000 points randomly distributed inside a square, showing apparent clusters and empty spaces

The clustering illusion is the tendency to erroneously consider the inevitable "streaks" or "clusters" arising in small samples from random distributions to be non-random. The illusion is caused by a human tendency to underpredict the amount of variability likely to appear in a small sample of random or pseudorandom data.

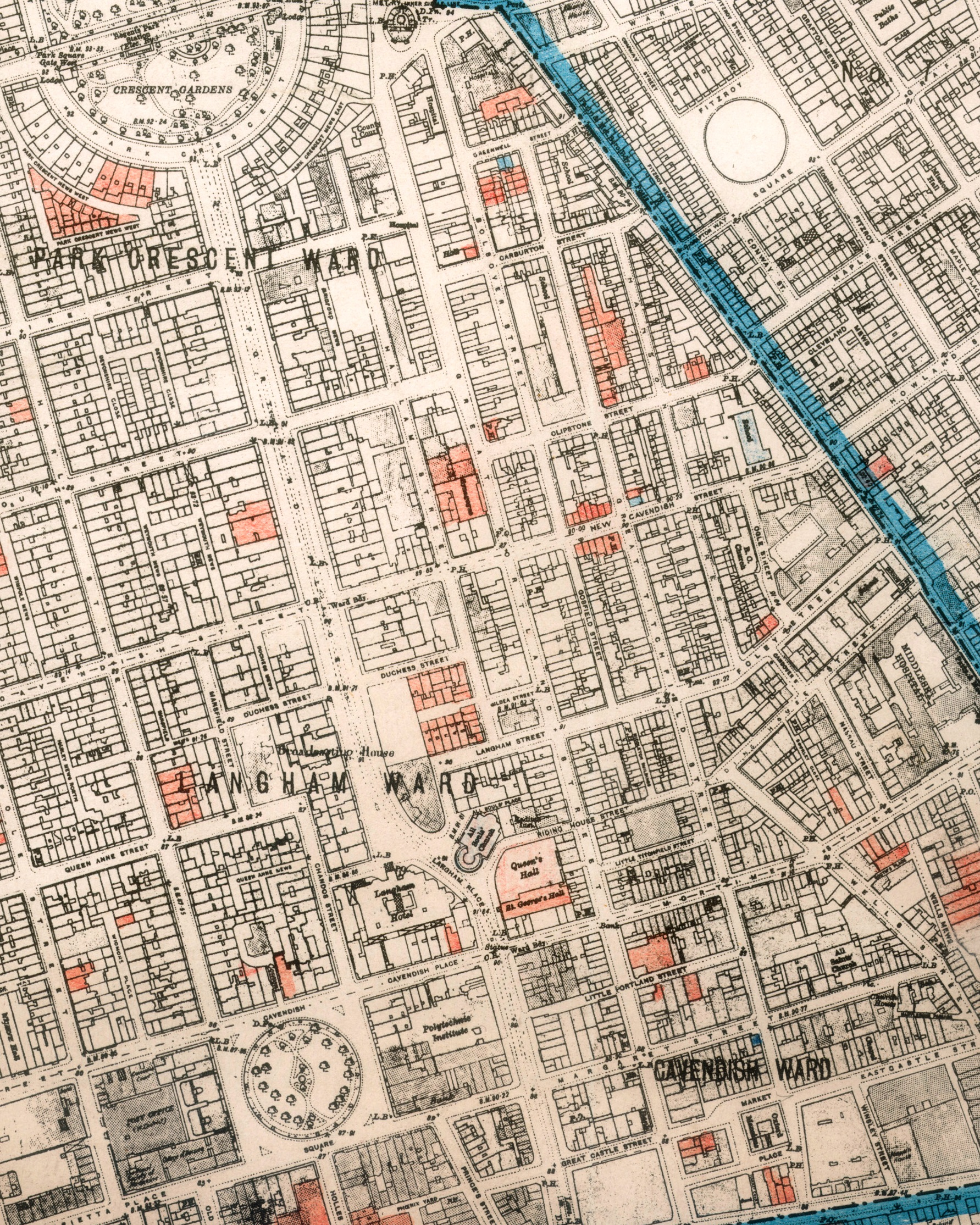
Map of air raid damage in Marylebone, London

Thomas Gilovich, an early author on the subject, argued that the effect occurs for different types of random dispersions. Some might perceive patterns in stock market price fluctuations over time, or clusters in two-dimensional data such as the locations of impact of World War II V-1 flying bombs on maps of London. Although Londoners developed specific theories about the pattern of impacts within London, a statistical analysis by R. D. Clarke originally published in 1946 showed that the impacts of V-2 rockets on London were a close fit to a random distribution.

== Similar biases ==
Using this cognitive bias in causal reasoning may result in the Texas sharpshooter fallacy, in which differences in data are ignored and similarities are overemphasized. More general forms of erroneous pattern recognition are pareidolia and apophenia. Related biases are the illusion of control which the clustering illusion could contribute to, and insensitivity to sample size in which people don't expect greater variation in smaller samples. A different cognitive bias involving misunderstanding of chance streams is the gambler's fallacy.

== Possible causes ==
Daniel Kahneman and Amos Tversky explained this kind of misprediction as being caused by the representativeness heuristic (which itself they also first proposed).

== See also ==
- Apophenia
- Alignments of random points
- Complete spatial randomness
- Confirmation bias
- Law of proximity (Gestalt psychology)
- List of cognitive biases
- Numeracy bias
- Poisson clumping
- Poisson distribution
- Statistical randomness
