= Gambler's conceit =

Fallacy

Gambler's conceit is the fallacy described by behavioral economist David J. Ewing where a gambler believes they will be able to stop a risky behavior while still engaging in it.

The gambler's conceit frequently works in conjunction with the gambler's fallacy, the mistaken idea that a losing streak in a game of chance, such as roulette, has to come to an end or is lowered because the frequency of one event has an effect on a following independent event.

== See also ==
- Behavioral economics
- Inverse gambler's fallacy
- Online gambling
- Short (finance)
