= Daniel M. Oppenheimer =

American psychologist

Daniel M. Oppenheimer is a professor of psychology at Carnegie Mellon University in the Department of Social and Decision Sciences. Previously, he was a professor at the UCLA Anderson School of Management. From 2004 to 2012, he worked at Princeton University's Department of Psychology.

Primarily interested in cognitive psychology, he researches causal discounting, charitable giving, perceptual fluency, and people's perceptions of randomness. He won the 2006 Ig Nobel Prize in Literature for his paper "Consequences of Erudite Vernacular Utilized Irrespective of Necessity: Problems with Using Long Words Needlessly", which argues that simple writing makes authors appear more intelligent than complex writing. In 2012, he co-authored a book with political scientist Mike Edwards on political psychology and democracy, Democracy Despite Itself: Why A System That Shouldn't Work at All Works So Well.

Oppenheimer earned his BA at Rice University and his MA and PhD from Stanford University.

== Publications ==
- Oppenheimer, Danny; Edwards, Mike (2012), Democracy Despite Itself: Why a System That Shouldn't Work at All Works So Well, MIT Press, p. 256, ISBN 978-0-262-01723-7
- Oppenheimer, Danny; Klein, Grady (2018), Psychologix : toute la psychologie expliquée en BD, Les Arènes BD, p. 224, ISBN 978-2-35204-725-4

== See also ==
- List of Ig Nobel Prize winners
