= List of psychological effects =

Psychological effects refer to phenomenons of thinking that are influenced by external factors. They are similar to cognitive biases. This article contains a list of 'effects' that have been noticed in the field of psychology.

- Ambiguity effect
- Assembly bonus effect
- Audience effect
- Baader–Meinhof effect
- Barnum effect
- Bezold effect
- Birthday-number effect
- Boomerang effect
- Bouba/kiki effect
- Bystander effect
- Cheerleader effect
- Cinderella effect
- Cocktail party effect
- Contrast effect
- Coolidge effect
- Crab mentality
- Crespi effect
- Cross-race effect
- Curse of knowledge
- Diderot effect
- Dunning–Kruger effect
- Einstellung effect
- Endowment effect
- Face superiority effect
- False fame effect
- False-consensus effect
- False-uniqueness effect
- Fan effect
- Florence Nightingale effect
- Flynn effect
- Focusing effect
- Framing effect
- Generation effect
- Golem effect
- Google effect
- Halo effect
- Hawthorne effect
- Hedonic treadmill
- Hostile media effect
- Hot-cold empathy gap
- Hypersonic effect
- Imposter syndrome
- Irrelevant speech effect
- Kappa effect
- Kewpie doll effect
- Kinetic depth effect
- Kuleshov effect
- Lady Macbeth effect
- Lake Wobegon effect
- Lawn dart effect
- Less-is-better effect
- Levels-of-processing effect
- Martha Mitchell effect
- Matthew effect
- McCollough effect
- McGurk effect
- Mere-exposure effect
- Mere ownership effect
- Microwave auditory effect
- Misinformation effect
- Missing letter effect
- Modality effect
- Mozart effect
- Munchausen syndrome
- Naive realism
- Name-letter effect
- Near-miss effect
- Negativity effect
- Nocebo effect
- Novelty effect
- Numerosity adaptation effect
- Observer-expectancy effect
- Out-group homogeneity effect
- Overconfidence effect
- Overjustification effect
- Peltzman effect
- Perruchet effect
- Picture superiority effect
- Placebo effect
- Pluralistic ignorance
- Positivity effect
- Pratfall effect
- Precedence effect
- Primacy effect
- Pseudocertainty effect
- Purkinje effect
- Pygmalion effect
- Rashomon effect
- Recency effect
- Rhyme-as-reason effect
- Ringelmann effect
- Self-fulfilling prophecy
- Self-reference effect
- Serial position effect
- Simon effect
- Sleeper effect
- Social facilitation
- Spacing effect
- Spotlight effect
- Stockholm syndrome
- Stroop effect
- Subadditivity effect
- Subject-expectancy effect
- Tamagotchi effect
- Telescoping effect
- Testing effect
- Tetris effect
- Thatcher effect
- Ventriloquism effect
- Venus effect
- Von Restorff effect
- Wagon-wheel effect
- Well travelled road effect
- Werther effect
- Westermarck effect
- Word frequency effect
- Word superiority effect
- Worse-than-average effect
- Zeigarnik effect

== See also ==
- List of cognitive biases
- List of fallacies
- False memory
- Uncanny valley
