= Physical attractiveness =

Aesthetic assessment of physical traits

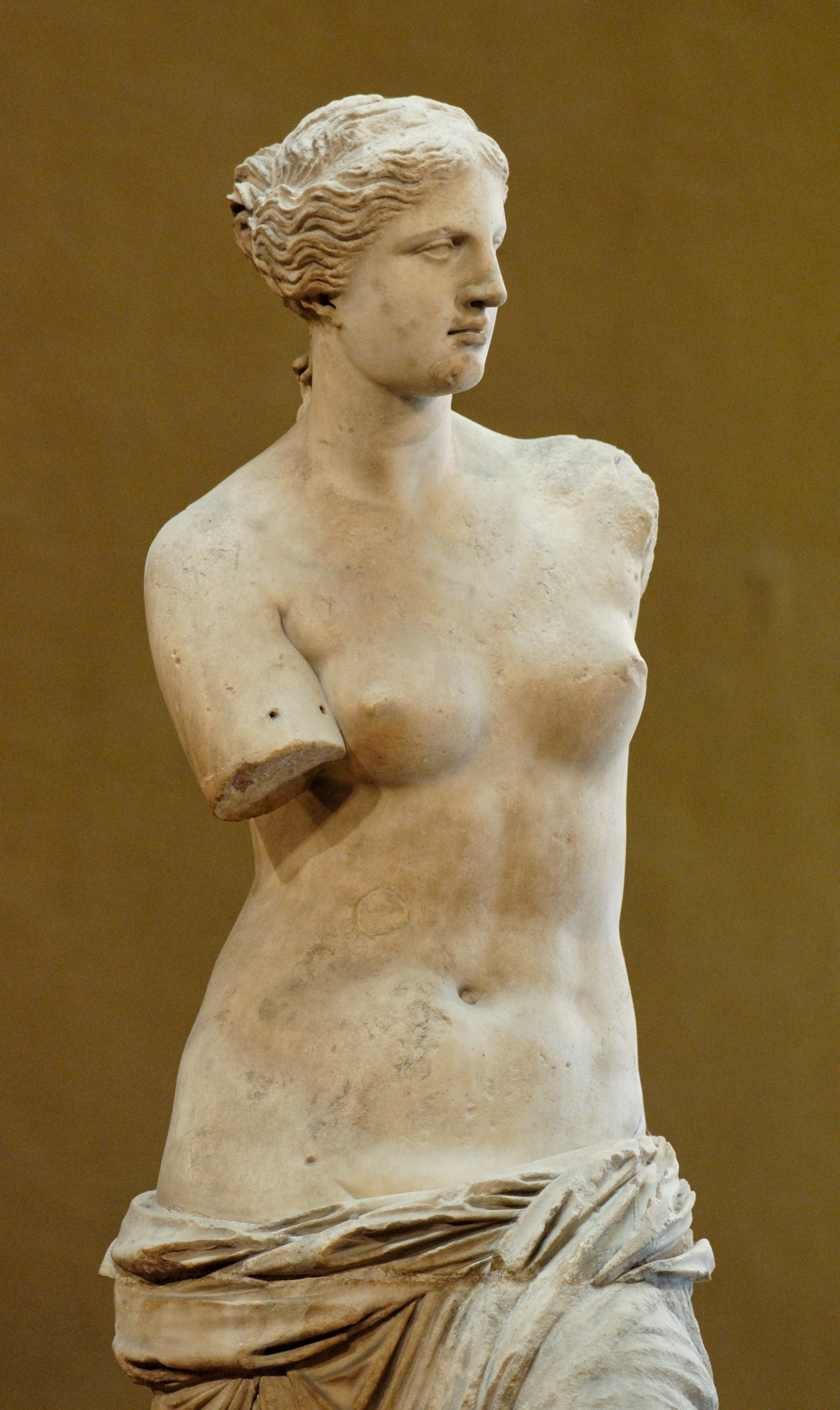
Venus de Milo at the Louvre has been described as a "classical vision of beauty". (Note: However, one expert suggested that her "almost matronly representation" was meant to convey an "impressive appearance" rather than "ideal female beauty".)

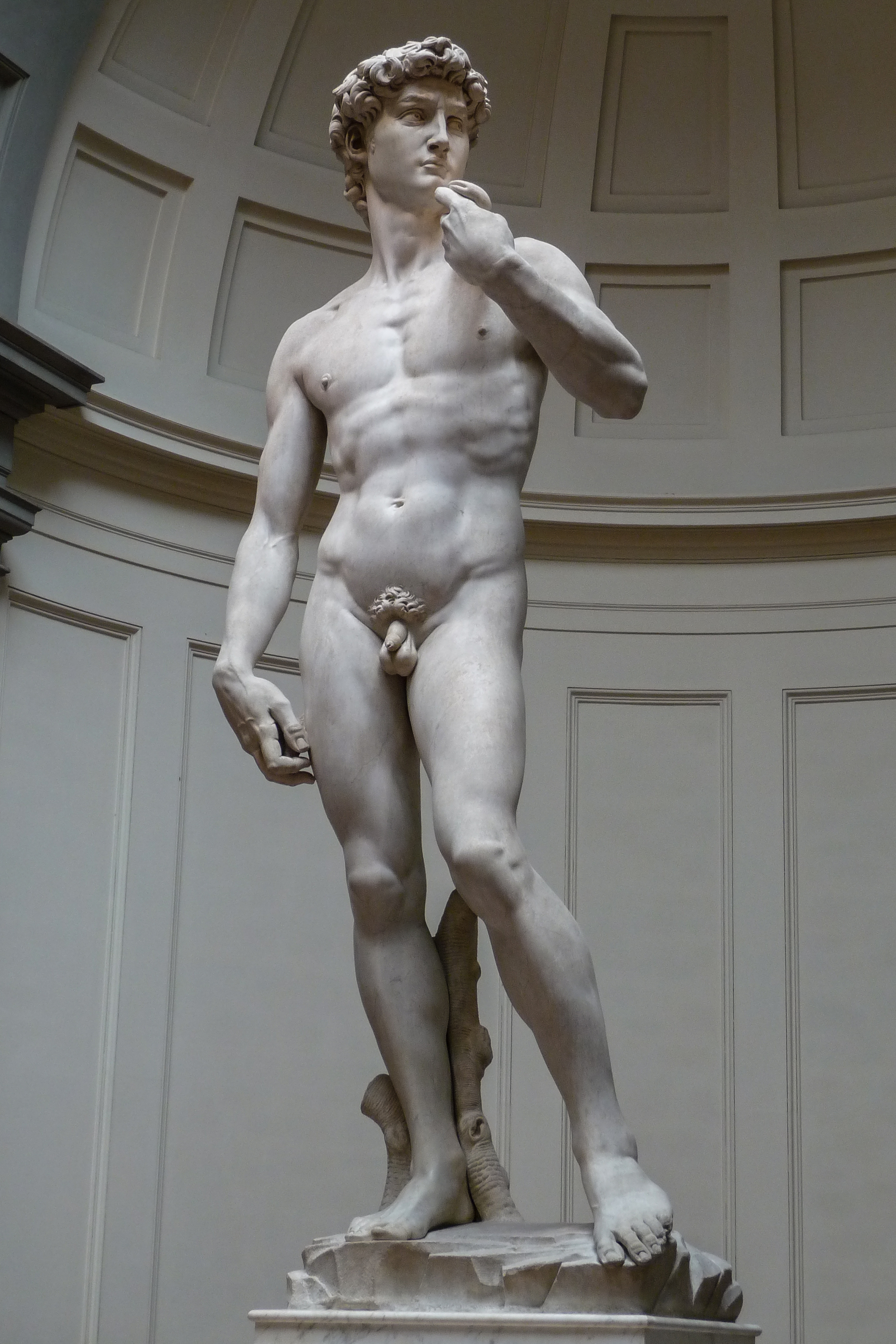
Michelangelo's David is considered a symbol of young male beauty and strength.

Physical attractiveness is the extent to which a person's physical features are considered aesthetically pleasing or beautiful. The term often implies sexual attractiveness or desirability but can also be distinct. Many factors influence one person's attraction to another, with physical aspects being one of them. Physical attraction includes universal perceptions common across human cultures, such as facial symmetry, as well as socioculturally dependent attributes, and personal preferences unique to each individual.

In many cases, humans subconsciously attribute positive characteristics, such as intelligence and honesty, to physically attractive people, a psychological phenomenon called the halo effect. Research done in the United States and United Kingdom found that objective measures of physical attractiveness and intelligence are positively correlated, and that the association between the two attributes is stronger among men than among women. Evolutionary psychologists have tried to answer why individuals who are more physically attractive should also, on average, be more intelligent, and have put forward the notion that both general intelligence and physical attractiveness may be indicators of underlying genetic fitness. A person's physical characteristics can signal cues to fertility and health, with statistical modeling studies showing that the facial shape variables that reflect aspects of physiological health, including body fat and blood pressure, also influence observers' perceptions of health. Attending to these factors increases reproductive success, furthering the representation of one's genes in the population.

Heterosexual men tend to be attracted to women who have a youthful appearance and exhibit features such as a symmetrical face, full breasts, full lips, and a low waist–hip ratio. Heterosexual women tend to be attracted to men who are taller than they are and who display a high degree of facial symmetry, masculine facial dimorphism, upper body strength, broad shoulders, a relatively narrow waist, and a V-shaped torso.

== General contributing factors ==
Generally, physical attractiveness can be viewed from a number of perspectives; with universal perceptions being common to all human cultures, cultural and social aspects, and individual subjective preferences. The perception of attractiveness can have a significant effect on how people are judged in terms of employment or social opportunities, friendship, sexual behaviour, and marriage.

Some physical features are attractive in both men and women, particularly bodily and facial symmetry, although one contrary report suggests that "absolute flawlessness" with perfect symmetry can be "disturbing". Symmetry may be evolutionarily beneficial as a sign of health because asymmetry "signals past illness or injury". One study suggested people were able to "gauge beauty at a subliminal level" by seeing only a glimpse of a picture for one-hundredth of a second. Other important factors include youthfulness, skin clarity and smoothness of skin, and "vivid colour" in the eyes and hair. However, there are numerous differences based on gender.

A 1921 study of the reports of college students regarding those traits argued that static traits, such as beauty or ugliness of features, hold a position subordinate to groups of physical elements like expressive behaviour, affectionate disposition, grace of manner, aristocratic bearing, social accomplishments and personal habits.

Grammer and colleagues have identified eight "pillars" of beauty: youthfulness, symmetry, averageness, sex-hormone markers, body odor, motion, skin complexion, and hair texture. Traditionally in Samoa, body fat was acceptable or attractive.

=== Facial features ===
An Italian study published in 2008 analyzed the positions of the 50 soft-tissue landmarks of the faces of 324 white Northern Italian adolescent boys and girls to compare the features of a group of 93 "beautiful" individuals selected by a commercial casting agency with those of a reference group with normal dentofacial dimensions and proportions. The research found that, in comparison with the reference group, the attractive adolescents tended to have the following characteristics:

- the ratio between the volume of the forehead and that of the total face was larger;
- the nasal volume was smaller;
- the distance between outer canthi was larger;
- total facial height and depth were reduced.

Some tendencies differed by age and sex:

- the facial volume was smaller in older attractive boys than in their peers, but bigger in attractive girls;
- the faces of older attractive adolescent boys were less rounded (bigger ratio between facial area and volume), but the reverse was true for girls of any age;
- attractive older boys had smaller angles of facial convexity with more acute profiles, while in girls the reverse pattern was found;
- the nasolabial angle was reduced in girls, but in older boys the effect was reversed;
- older attractive boys tended to have more prominent chins.

The study concluded that attractive adolescents had more neotenous and juvenile features, but older attractive boys also showed tendencies towards sexual dimorphism.

Contrary to common misconception, one study finds that non-severe facial scarring increases male attractiveness for short-term relationships.

=== Symmetry ===
Symmetrical faces and bodies may be signs of good inheritance to women of child-bearing age seeking to create healthy offspring. Studies suggest women are less attracted to men with asymmetrical faces, and symmetrical faces correlate with long-term mental performance and are an indication that a man has experienced "fewer genetic and environmental disturbances such as diseases, toxins, malnutrition or genetic mutations" while growing. Since achieving symmetry is a difficult task during human growth, requiring billions of cell reproductions while maintaining a parallel structure, achieving symmetry is a visible signal of genetic health.

Studies have also suggested that women at peak fertility were more likely to fantasise about men with greater facial symmetry, and other studies have found that male symmetry was the only factor that could significantly predict the likelihood of a woman experiencing orgasm during sex. Women with partners possessing greater symmetry reported significantly more copulatory female orgasms than were reported by women with partners possessing low symmetry, even with many potential confounding variables controlled. This finding has been found to hold across different cultures. It has been argued that masculine facial dimorphism (in men) and symmetry in faces are signals advertising genetic quality in potential mates. Low facial and body fluctuating asymmetry may indicate good health and intelligence, which are desirable features. Studies have found that women who perceive themselves as being more physically attractive are more likely to favour men with a higher degree of facial symmetry than are women who perceive themselves as being less physically attractive. It has been found that symmetrical females and males have a tendency to begin to have sexual intercourse at an earlier age, to have more sexual partners, and to have more one-night stands. They are also more likely to engage in infidelity. A study of quarterbacks in the American National Football League found a positive correlation between facial symmetry and salaries.

=== Body scent ===
Double-blind studies found that women prefer the scent of men who are rated as facially attractive. For example, both males and females were more attracted to the natural scent of individuals who had been rated by consensus as facially attractive. Additionally, it has also been shown that women have a preference for the scent of men with more symmetrical faces, and that women's preference for the scent of more symmetrical men is strongest during the most fertile period of their menstrual cycle. Within the set of normally cycling women, individual women's preference for the scent of men with high facial symmetry correlated with their probability of conception. Men's body odor is also affected by their diet, with women expressing preferences for male body odor associated with increased dietary fruit, vegetable and protein content, and reduced carbohydrate content.

=== Genetics ===
Studies have explored the genetic basis behind such issues as facial symmetry and body scent and how they influence physical attraction. In one study in which women wore men's T-shirts, researchers found that women were more attracted to the bodily scents in shirts of men who had a different type of gene section within the DNA called major histocompatibility complex (MHC). MHC is a large gene area within the DNA of vertebrates which encodes proteins dealing with the immune system and which influences individual bodily odors. One hypothesis is that humans are naturally attracted by the sense of smell and taste to others with dissimilar MHC sections, perhaps to avoid subsequent inbreeding while increasing the genetic diversity of offspring. Furthermore, there are studies showing that women's natural attraction for men with dissimilar immune profiles can be distorted with use of birth control pills. Other research findings involving the genetic foundations of attraction suggest that MHC heterozygosity positively correlates with male facial attractiveness. Women judge the faces of men who are heterozygous at all three MHC loci to be more attractive than the faces of men who are homozygous at one or more of these loci. Additionally, a second experiment with genotyped women raters, found these preferences were independent of the degree of MHC similarity between the men and the female rater. With MHC heterozygosity independently seen as a genetic advantage, the results suggest that facial attractiveness in men may be a measure of genetic quality. General genetic heterozygosity has been demonstrated to be related to attractiveness in that people with mixed genetic backgrounds (i.e., mixed race people) are seen as more attractive than people with more genetically similar parents (i.e., single race people). However, some studies have not found that mixed race individuals are rated as more attractive, and one found that only certain mixes were rated as more attractive; this study argued that equating race with genetics was incorrect and argued for social influences as the cause.

=== Youthfulness ===
A 2010 study by American dating site OkCupid on 200,000 of its male and female users found that heterosexual women—except those during their early to mid-twenties—are open to relationships with both somewhat older and somewhat younger men; they have a larger potential dating pool than men until age 26. At age 20, women, in a "dramatic change", begin sending private messages to significantly older men. At age 29, they become "even more open to older men". Male desirability to women peaks in the late 20s and does not fall below the average for all men until 36. Other research indicates that women, irrespective of their own age, tend to be more attracted to men who are the same age or older.

For the Romans especially, "beardlessness" and "smooth young bodies" were considered beautiful to both men and women. For Greek and Roman men, the most desirable traits of boys were their "youth" and "hairlessness". Pubescent boys were considered a socially appropriate object of male desire, while post-pubescent boys were considered to be "ἔξωροι" or "past the prime". This was largely in the context of pederasty (adult male interest in adolescent boys). Today, men and women's attitudes towards male beauty have changed. For example, body hair on men may even be preferred (see below).

A 1984 study said that gay men tend to prefer gay men of the same age as ideal partners, but there was a statistically significant effect (p < 0.05) of masculinity-femininity. The study said that more feminine men tended to prefer relatively older men than themselves and more masculine men tended to prefer relatively younger men than themselves.

Cross-cultural data shows that the reproductive success of women is tied to their youth and physical attractiveness, such as the pre-industrial Sami where the most reproductively successful women were 15 years younger than their man. One study covering 37 cultures showed that, on average, a woman was 2.5 years younger than her male partner, with the age difference in Nigeria and Zambia being at the far extreme of 6.5 to 7.5 years. As men age, they tend to seek a mate who is younger.

25% of online dating website eHarmony's male customers over the age of 50 request to only be matched with women younger than 40. The 2010 OkCupid study found that female desirability to its male users peaks at age 21, and falls below the average for all women at 31. After age 26, men have a larger potential dating pool than women on the site; and by age 48, their pool is almost twice as large. The median 31-year-old male user searches for women aged 22-to-35, while the median 42-year-old male searches for women 27-to-45. The age skew is even greater with messages to other users; the median 30-year-old male messages teenage girls as often as women his own age, while mostly ignoring women a few years older than him. Excluding the 10% most and 10% least beautiful women, women's attractiveness does not change between 18 and 40. If extremes are included, however, "there's no doubt that younger [women] are more physically attractive – indeed in many ways beauty and youth are inextricable. That's why most of the models you see in magazines are teenagers".

Pheromones (detected by female hormone markers) reflect female fertility and the reproductive value mean. As females age, the estrogen-to-androgen production ratio changes and results in female faces to appear more masculine (thus appearing less "attractive"). In a small (n=148) study performed in the United States, using male college students at one university, the mean age expressed as ideal for a wife was found to be 16.87 years old, while 17.76 was the mean ideal age for a brief sexual encounter. However, the study sets up a framework where "taboos against sex with young girls" are purposely diminished, and biased their sample by removing any participant over the age of 30, with a mean participant age of 19.83. In a study of penile tumescence, men were found most aroused by pictures of young adult females.

Signals of fertility in women are often also seen as signals of youth. The evolutionary perspective proposes the idea that when it comes to sexual reproduction, the minimal parental investment required by men gives them the ability and desire to simply reproduce 'as much as possible.' It therefore makes sense that men are attracted to the features in women which signal youthfulness, and thus fertility. Their chances of reproductive success are much higher than they would be should they pair with someone older—and therefore less fertile.

This may explain why combating age declines in attractiveness occurs from a younger age in women than in men. For example, the removal of one's body hair is considered a very feminine thing to do. This can be explained by the fact that aging results in raised levels of testosterone and thus, body hair growth. Shaving reverts one's appearance to a more youthful stage and although this may not be an honest signal, men will interpret this as a reflection of increased fertile value. Research supports this, showing hairlessness is considered sexually attractive by men.

=== Leg-to-body ratio ===
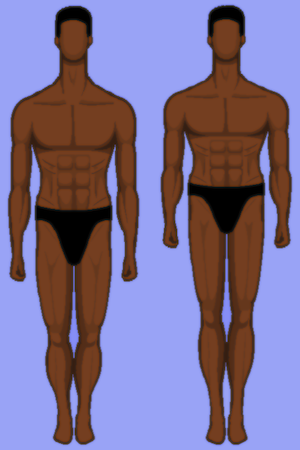
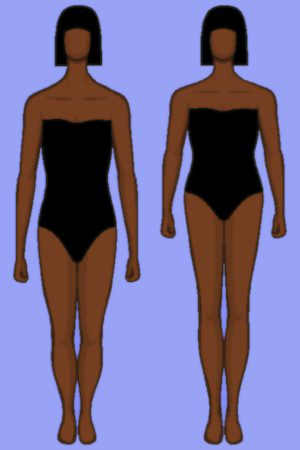
These drawings of two male and two female figures is a remake of the drawing of the extremes of leg-to-body ratio (LBR), as used in the experiment by Swami et al. (2006) to find out what LBR is considered the most attractive for British men and women. The male figure with the lowest LBR and shortest legs at left had the highest average attractiveness ratings whereas the male figure with the highest LBR and longest legs at right had the lowest ratings from. The female figure with the lowest LBR and shortest legs at left had the lowest average attractiveness ratings whereas the figure with the highest LBR and longest legs at right had the highest average attractiveness ratings.

"Leg-to-body ratio" is seen as an indicator of physical attractiveness but there appears to be no single accepted definition of leg-length: the 'perineum-to-floor' measure (Note: The "sitting body ratio" (SBR) is also quoted, where the trunk is measured with subject sitting on a flat table, and the leg-length determined by subtraction from standing height. This is almost the same as the perineum-to-floor distance but without the need to touch an intimate area.) is the most frequently used, but arguably the distance from the ankle bone to the outer hip bone is more rigorous. With the latter metric, the most attractive male leg-to-body ratio (judged by American women) is 1:1. A Japanese study using the former metric found the same result for male attractiveness, but women with longer legs than the rest of their body were judged to be more attractive. Excessive deviations from the mean were seen as indicative of disease. A study using Polish participants found that legs 5% longer than the average for both sexes was considered most attractive. The study concluded this preference might stem from the influence of long-legged runway models. Another study using British and American participants found "mid-ranging" leg-to-body ratios to be most ideal.

A study by Swami et al. of British male and female undergraduates showed a preference for men with legs as long as the rest of their body and women with 40% longer legs than the rest of their body. The researcher concluded that this preference might be influenced by American culture, in which long-legged women are portrayed as more attractive.

Marco Bertamini criticised the Swami et al. study for using a picture of the same person with digitally altered leg lengths which he felt would make the modified image appear unrealistic. Bertamini also criticised the Swami study for only changing the leg length while keeping the arm length constant. After accounting for these concerns in his own study, Bertamini, using stick figures, also found a preference for women with proportionately longer legs than men. When Bertamini investigated the issue of possible sexual dimorphism of leg length, he found two sources that indicated that men usually have slightly proportionately longer legs than women or that differences in leg length proportion may not exist between men and women. Following this review of existing literature on the subject, he conducted his own calculations using data from 1774 men and 2208 women. Using this data, he similarly found that men usually have slightly proportionately longer legs than women or that differences in leg length proportion may not exist between men and women. These findings made him rule out the possibility that a preference for women with proportionately longer legs than men is due to proportionately longer legs being a secondary sex characteristic of women.

=== Genitalia ===
A 2006 study of 25,594 heterosexual men found that "men who perceived themselves as having a large penis were more satisfied with their own appearance".

A 2014 study criticized previous studies based on the fact that they relied on images and used terms such as "small", "medium", and "large" when asking for female preference. The new study used 3D models of penises from sizes of 4 inches (10 cm) long and 2.5 inches (6.4 cm) in circumference to 8.5 inches (22 cm) long and 7 inches (18 cm) in circumference and let the women "view and handle" them. It was found that women overestimated the actual size of the penises they experimented with when asked in a follow-up survey. The study concluded that "women on average preferred the 6.5-inch (17 cm) penis in length both for long-term and for one-time partners. Penises with larger girth were preferred for one-time partners."

Evidence from various cultures suggests that heterosexual men tend to find the sight of women's genitalia to be sexually arousing.

=== Skin colour ===
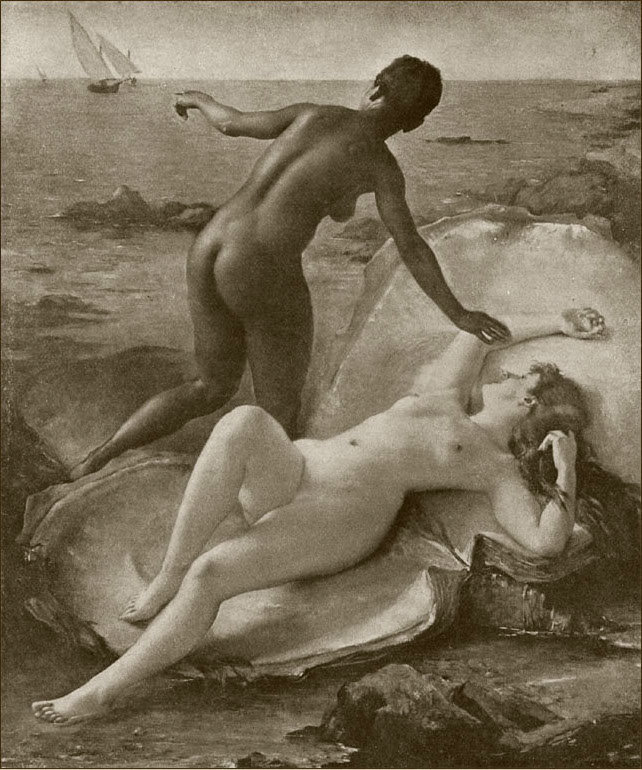
Les Deux Perles Fernand Le Quesne (The two pearls, 1889). This painting was intended to "contrast a Caucasian with an African beauty". In the painting, the black woman represents the beauty of a black pearl and the white woman represents the beauty of a white pearl.

Manual labourers who spent extended periods of time outside developed a darker skin tone due to exposure to the sun. As a consequence, an association between dark skin and the lower classes developed. Light skin became an aesthetic ideal because it symbolised wealth. "Over time society attached various meanings to these coloured differences. Including assumptions about a person's race, socioeconomic class, intelligence, and physical attractiveness."

Some research has suggested that redder and yellower skin tones, reflecting higher levels of oxygenated blood, carotenoid and to a lesser extent melanin pigment, and net dietary intakes of fruit and vegetables, appear healthier, and therefore more attractive. However, there is little direct evidence that skin colour is actually related to health or immune system strength.

A historical preference for lighter-skinned women has been documented across many cultures. However, the accuracy of this research has been questioned by other authors. Experimental studies show that white Western men are more attracted to tanned women, rather than pale women, and that women themselves believe that they are more attractive with tan skin. A 2010 study found a preference for lighter-skinned (but not lightest) women in New Zealand and California. However, other research has found that African-American males and females consider medium complexion as more attractive than lighter or darker skin, while white and Hispanic women seek to tan their skin in order to increase their attractiveness to the opposite sex. There is a direct correlation between being tan and self-perceived attractiveness, especially among young women.

According to research from China, since the 2010s, tan skin has emerged as the new beauty ideal for women in China, and Chinese women themselves believe their tan skin is more attractive and healthier than pale skin. Similar findings from Japan have found that the ideal female skin colour is tan, with no spots or roughness. There is a widespread perception in Japan that White women's skin is less beautiful than Japanese women's, as White women are stereotyped as being too pale and roughly textured.

The relationship between attractiveness and skin colour may also intersect with ethnicity and prior experience. Skin colour preferences may shift over time, as in Western culture, where tanned skin used to be associated with the sun-exposed manual labour of the lower-class, but since the mid-20th century it has generally been considered more attractive and healthier than before, with sun tanning becoming fashionable. In the African state of Mali, skin bleaching is common as it is thought to improve one's social standing and attractiveness to the opposite sex, although there has also been vocal opposition to this notion from pop culture icons.

Skin radiance or glowing skin may influence perception of beauty and physical attractiveness.

=== Hands ===
Hands have been found to be physically attractive. The type of hands that are physically attractive are those with longer index and ring fingers. Men have a smaller index-to-ring-finger ratio than women. The gender differences in the ratio between the index and ring fingers are said to be influenced by exposure to testosterone within the womb. In a study where participants were shown computer-based images of hands, male participants found feminine hands with a smaller index finger less attractive. Whereas females found masculine hands with a longer ring finger more attractive. The study suggests that finger length has an effect on physical attraction because it gives indication of the desirable sex-hormone dependent traits which one may possess. Another study found that averageness, healthiness of the skin, how fat the hands appear to be, and the grooming of the hands, all affect the attractiveness of hands. What is meant by averageness is the degree to which the hands look like an average of the hands in the population. Average-looking hands give an indication of an individual's health (because there are no abnormalities).

The healthier-looking the skin on the hands, the more attractive they appear. Reasons given for this say skin health may reflect an individual's overall health. Healthy skin can show that someone is free from illness because some illnesses have a bad effect on the look of skin. These features are found attractive because they show that the person has good genes and is therefore a suitable mate to reproduce with. Skin health may also give an indication of socioeconomic status, as rough hands may indicate a low-paying, laborious job. Low socioeconomic status might show that someone does not have resources to provide for the offspring, and is therefore less attractive. The more fat the hands appear, the less attractive they are. This is because of the co-morbidity associated with obesity. If someone is overweight, they may have another disease, which means they may not be able to produce healthy offspring. The attractiveness of the hands also gives an indication of other features of the individual; people with more attractive hands have been found to be taller and slimmer. In most of these hand attractiveness studies, only white, European hands were used, and the participants were 18–26 years old. So, the attractiveness of non-white hands and of different age groups was not tested. Also, the people who rated the hand attractiveness were white Europeans, so their ratings may not represent how individuals of other skin colours and cultures would rate the hands.

=== Height ===
Females' sexual attraction towards males may be strongly affected by the height of the man. For example, the dating site eHarmony only matches women with men taller than themselves, because of complaints from women matched with shorter men.

Other studies have shown that heterosexual women often prefer men taller than they are, rather than a man with above average height. While women usually desire men to be at least the same height as themselves or taller, several other factors also determine male attractiveness, and the "taller male" norm is not universal. For example, shorter women are more likely to relax the "taller male" norm than taller women. Furthermore, professor Adam Eyre-Walker, from the University of Sussex, has stated that there is, as yet, no evidence that these preferences are evolutionary preferences, as opposed to merely cultural preferences. Still, the cultural perceived attractiveness preferences for taller men are powerful and confirmed by multiple studies. One study of speed-daters by Stulp found that "women were most likely to choose [men] 25 cm taller than themselves, whereas men were most likely to choose women only 7 cm shorter than themselves".

Additionally, women seem more receptive to an erect posture than men, though both prefer it as an element within beauty. According to one study (Yee N., 2002), gay men who identify as "only tops" tend to prefer shorter men, while gay men who identify as "only bottoms" tend to prefer taller men.

In romances in Middle English literature, all of the "ideal" male heroes are tall, and the vast majority of the "valiant" male heroes are tall too.

Most men tend to be taller than their female partners. In Western societies, it has been found that most men prefer women shorter than themselves. Nevertheless, height is a more important factor for a woman when choosing a man than it is for a man choosing a woman. Western men tend to view women taller than themselves as less attractive, and many people view heterosexual couples where the woman is taller to be less ideal. Women who are 0.7 to 1.7 standard deviations below the mean female height have been reported to be the most reproductively successful, since fewer tall women get married compared to shorter women. However, in other ethnic groups, such as the Hadza people from Tanzania, a study has found that height is irrelevant in choosing a mate. Another study found the same preference in rural Gambia.

In Middle English literature, "tallness" is a characteristic of ideally beautiful women. The British Fashion Model Agents Association (BFMA) says that female models should be at least 5 ft 8 in (1.73 m) tall.

=== Body language ===
==== Standing postures ====
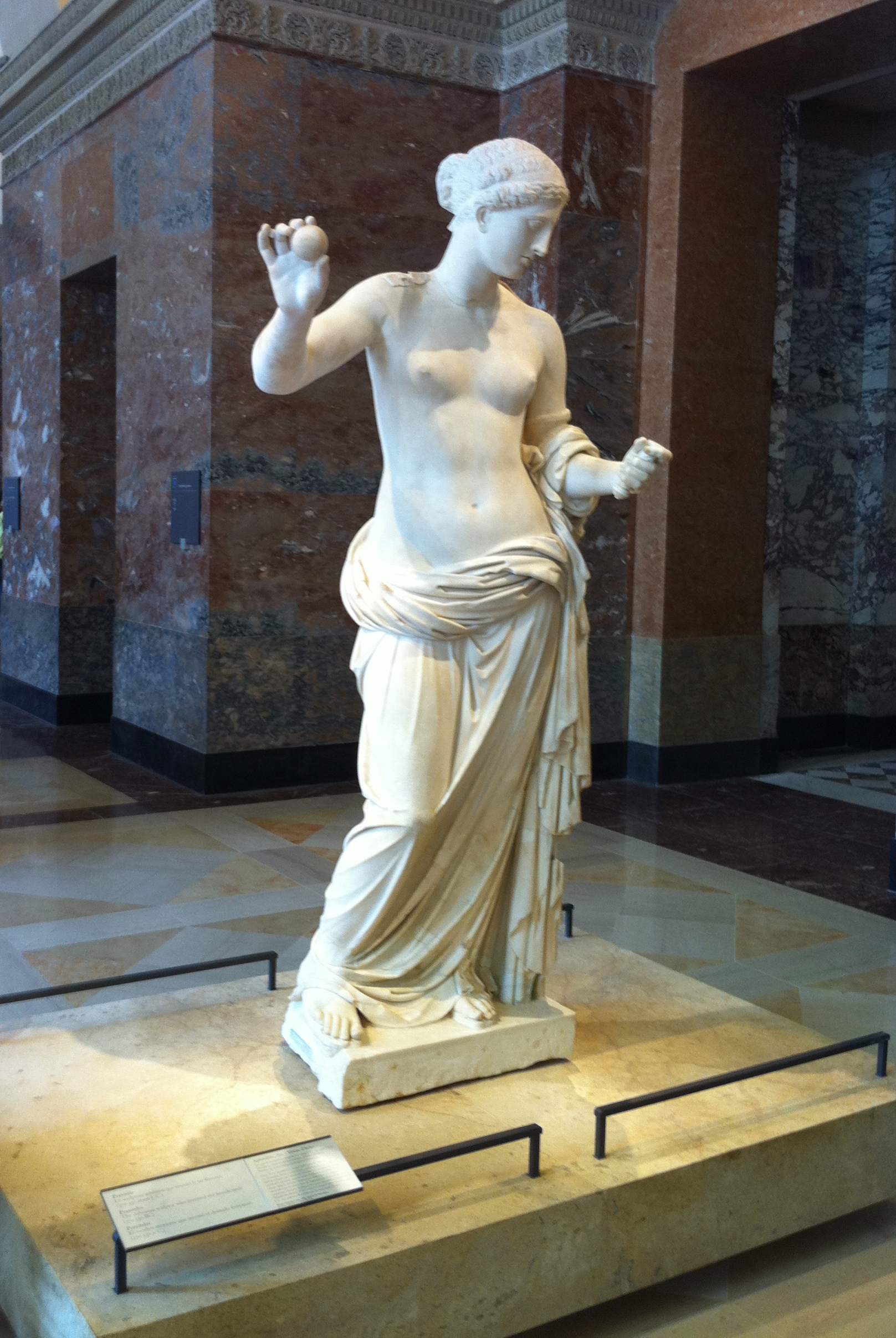
A statue of Venus standing in a contrapposto pose with her weight borne predominantly on one leg. As shown here, this posture accentuates the curvature of her figure.

Standing in a contrapposto posture (with bodyweight predominantly supported by one leg which is either straight, or very slightly bent, and with the other leg slightly bent) has been found to be more attractive looking than standing in a more plain, upright posture. This was found to be the case for both men and women. This posture may lower a person's observable waist-hip ratio and make their hips look wider and their waists thinner. For women especially, this can accentuate the curvature of their figure on one side of their body and make them seem more attractive. Such poses have been used in historical sculpture to emphasize an ideal of physical beauty. It has also been demonstrated that the contrapposto posture in women elicits more neural activity in brain areas linked to perception and attractiveness assessments than a standing position.

==== Movement patterns ====
The way an individual moves can influence attractiveness and indicate health and age. A study reflecting the views of 700 individuals and that involved animated representations of people walking, found that the physical attractiveness of women increased by about 50 percent when they walked with a hip sway. Similarly, the perceived attractiveness of males doubled when they moved with a swagger in their shoulders.

== Male-specific factors ==
Women, on average, tend to be more attracted to men who have a relatively narrow waist, a V-shaped torso, wide chest and broad shoulders. Women also tend to be more attracted to men who are taller and larger than they are, and display a high degree of facial symmetry, as well as relatively masculine facial dimorphism. There is evidence that women tend to be less interested in a partner's physical attractiveness than men.

=== Sexual dimorphism ===
The degree of differences between male and female anatomical traits is called sexual dimorphism. Female respondents in the follicular phase of their menstrual cycle were significantly more likely to choose a masculine face than those in menses and luteal phases, (or in those taking hormonal contraception). This distinction supports the sexy son hypothesis, which posits that it is evolutionarily advantageous for women to select potential fathers who are more genetically attractive, rather than the best caregivers. However, women's likeliness to exert effort to view male faces does not seem to depend on their masculinity, but to a general increase with women's testosterone levels.

It is suggested that the masculinity of facial features is a reliable indication of good health, or, alternatively, that masculine-looking males are more likely to achieve high status. However, the correlation between attractive facial features and health has been questioned. Sociocultural factors, such as self-perceived attractiveness, status in a relationship and degree of gender-conformity, have been reported to play a role in female preferences for male faces. Studies have found that women who perceive themselves as physically attractive are more likely to choose men with masculine facial dimorphism, than are women who perceive themselves as physically unattractive. In men, facial masculinity significantly correlates with facial symmetry – it has been suggested that both are signals of developmental stability and genetic health. One study called into question the importance of facial masculinity in physical attractiveness in men, arguing that when perceived health, which is factored into facial masculinity, is discounted it makes little difference in physical attractiveness. In a cross-country study involving 4,794 women in their early twenties, a difference was found in women's average "masculinity preference" between countries.

A study found that the same genetic factors cause facial masculinity in both males and females such that a male with a more masculine face would likely have a sister with a more masculine face due to the siblings having shared genes. The study also found that, although female faces that were more feminine were judged to be more attractive, there was no association between male facial masculinity and male facial attractiveness for female judges. With these findings, the study reasoned that if a woman were to reproduce with a man with a more masculine face, then her daughters would also inherit a more masculine face, making the daughters less attractive. The study concluded that there must be other factors that advantage the genetics for masculine male faces to offset their reproductive disadvantage in terms of "health", "fertility" and "facial attractiveness" when the same genetics are present in females. The study reasoned that the "selective advantage" for masculine male faces must "have (or had)" been due to some factor that is not directly tied to female perceptions of male facial attractiveness.

In a study of 447 gay men in China, researchers said that tops preferred feminised male faces, bottoms preferred masculinised male faces and versatiles had no preference for either feminised or masculinised male faces.

In pre-modern Chinese literature, the ideal man in caizi jiaren romances was said to have "rosy lips, sparkling white teeth" and a "jasper-like face" (Chinese: 唇紅齒白、面若冠玉).

In Middle English literature, a beautiful man should have a long, broad and strong face.

=== Waist-to-chest ratio ===
The physique of a slim waist, broad shoulders and muscular chest are often found to be attractive to both females and males. Further research has shown that, when choosing a mate, the traits females look for indicate higher social status, such as dominance, resources, and protection. An indicator of health in males (a contributing factor to physical attractiveness) is the android fat distribution pattern which is categorised as more fat distributed on the upper body and abdomen, commonly referred to as the "V shape." When asked to rate other men, both heterosexual and homosexual men found low waist-to-chest ratios (WCR) to be more attractive on other men, with the gay men showing a preference for lower WCR (more V-shaped) than the straight men.

Other researchers found waist-to-chest ratio the largest determinant of male attractiveness, with body mass index and waist-to-hip ratio not as significant.

Women focus primarily on the ratio waist to chest or more specifically waist to shoulder. This is analogous to the waist to hip ratio (WHR) that men prefer. Some studies have shown that attractive bodily traits in the eyes of a heterosexual woman would include a tall, athletic physique, with wide shoulders, and a slim waist area. Research has additionally shown that college males had a better satisfaction with their body than college females. The research also found that when a college female's waist to hip ratio went up, their body image satisfaction decreased.

Some research has shown that body weight may have a stronger effect than WHR when it comes to perceiving attractiveness of the opposite sex. It was found that waist to hip ratio played a smaller role in body preference than body weight in regards to both sexes.

Psychologists Viren Swami and Martin J. Tovee compared female preference for male attractiveness cross culturally, between Britain and Malaysia. They found that females placed more importance on WCR (and therefore body shape) in urban areas of Britain and Malaysia, while females in rural areas placed more importance on BMI (therefore weight and body size). Both WCR and BMI are indicative of male status and ability to provide for offspring, as noted by evolutionary theory.

Females have been found to desire males that are normal weight and have the average WHR for a male. Females view these males as attractive and healthy. Males who had the average WHR but were overweight or underweight are not perceived as attractive to females. This suggests that WHR is not a major factor in male attractiveness, but a combination of body weight and a typical male WHR seem to be the most attractive. Research has shown that men who have a higher waist to hip ratio and a higher salary are perceived as more attractive to women.

=== Flat abdomen ===
A 1982 study found that an abdomen that protrudes was the "least attractive" trait for men.

In Middle English literature, a beautiful man should have a flat abdomen.

=== Musculature ===
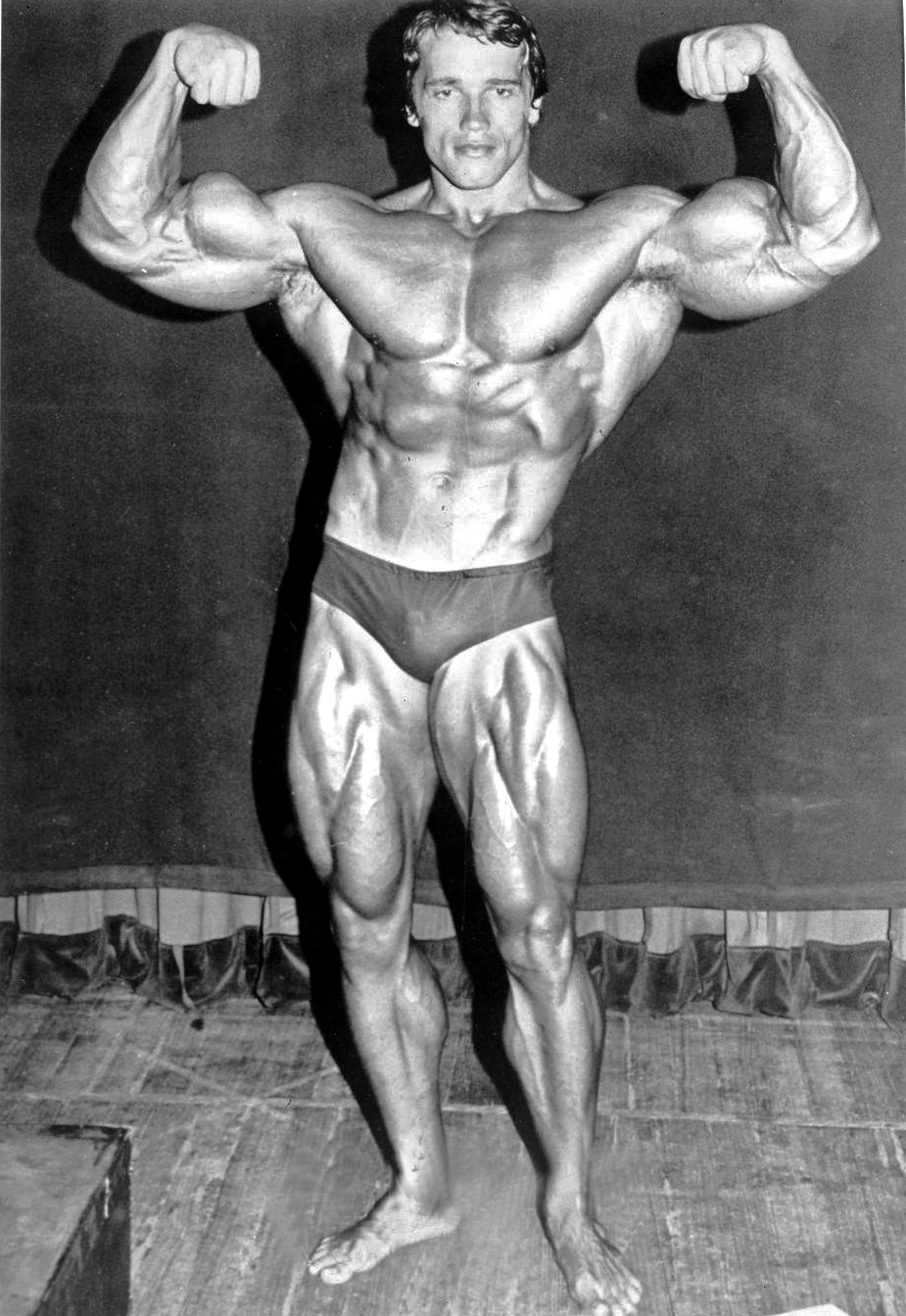
Arnold Schwarzenegger, one of the most notable figures in bodybuilding, 1974

Men's bodies portrayed in magazines marketed to men are more muscular than the men's bodies portrayed in magazines marketed to women. From this, some have concluded that men perceive a more muscular male body to be ideal, as distinct from a woman's ideal male, which is less muscular than what men perceive to be ideal. This is due to the within-gender prestige granted by increased muscularity and within-gender competition for increased muscularity. Men perceive the attractiveness of their own musculature by how closely their bodies resemble the "muscle man." This "muscle man" ideal is characterized by large muscular arms, especially biceps, a large muscular chest that tapers to their waist and broad shoulders. Among Australian university students, the male body composition found to be most attractive (12.16 kg fat, 63.27 kg muscle) was in line with the composition that was perceived as healthiest, and was well within the healthy range.

In a study of stated profile preferences on Match.com, a greater percentage of gay men than lesbians selected their ideal partner's body type as "Athletic and Toned" as opposed to the other two options of "Average" or "Overweight".

In pre-modern Chinese literature, such as in Romance of the Western Chamber, a type of masculinity called "scholar masculinity" is depicted wherein the "ideal male lover" is "weak, vulnerable, feminine, and pedantic".

In Middle English literature, a beautiful man typically has thick, broad shoulders, a square and muscular chest, a muscular back, strong sides that taper to a small waist, large hands and arms and legs with huge muscles.

=== Body hair ===
Studies based in the United States, New Zealand, and China have shown that women rate men with no trunk (chest and abdominal) hair as most attractive, and that attractiveness ratings decline as hairiness increases. Another study, however, found that moderate amounts of trunk hair on men was most attractive, to the sample of British and Sri Lankan women. Further, a degree of hirsuteness (hairiness) and a waist-to-shoulder ratio of 0.6 is often preferred when combined with a muscular physique.

In a study using Finnish women, women with hairy fathers were more likely to prefer hairy men, suggesting that preference for hairy men is the result of either genetics or imprinting. Among gay men, another study reported gay males who identify as "only tops" prefer less hairy men, while gay males who identify as "only bottoms" prefer more hairy men.

=== Facial hair ===
One study shows that men with facial hair covering the cheeks, upper lip, and lower jaw were perceived as more physically attractive than men with patchy facial hair. In this study, men's facial hair was split into four categories, each differing in the thickness and coverage: very light, light, medium, and heavy. Light facial hair was rated as the most attractive, followed by medium, heavy, and the least attractive was 'very light'. This study suggests that some facial hair is better than none because it shows masculine development, as beard growth requires the conversion of testosterone. An earlier study found that women from Western and Oceanic cultures are more attracted to clean-shaven faces than beards. However, they also rated full-bearded men as having higher status than clean-shaven men.

=== Jawline ===
More angular male jawlines tend to be selected as ideal in Western countries, while the ideal female jawline is rounder and softer.

Most research shows that attractive bigonial width and Ramus measurements have similarities, but the jutting square chin is a prominently European-heritage trait – which means it should not be held as a universal indicator of attractiveness. Men with low submental fat were viewed to have "better jawlines" and a more "youthful look".

== Female-specific factors ==
Research indicates that heterosexual men tend to be attracted to young and beautiful women with bodily symmetry. Rather than decreasing it, modernity has only increased the emphasis men place on women's looks. Evolutionary psychologists attribute such attraction to an evaluation of the fertility potential in a prospective mate.

=== Facial features ===
==== General ====
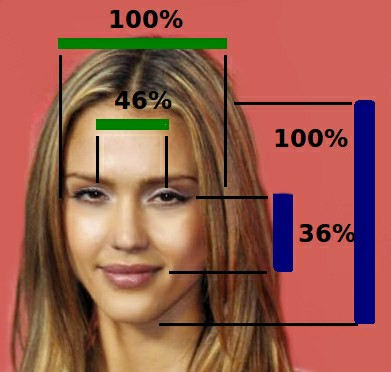
A University of Toronto study found that the facial proportions of Jessica Alba were close to the average of all female profiles.

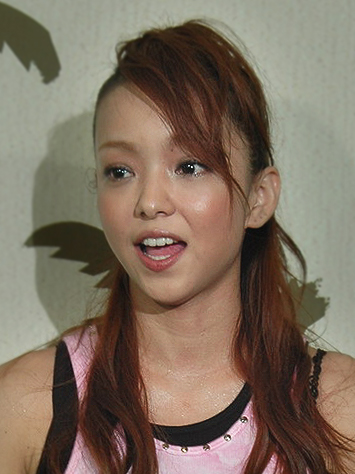
Namie Amuro inspired the small-face fad in Japan which caused Japanese women to buy beauty products such as masks and creams to try to obtain a small face like hers.

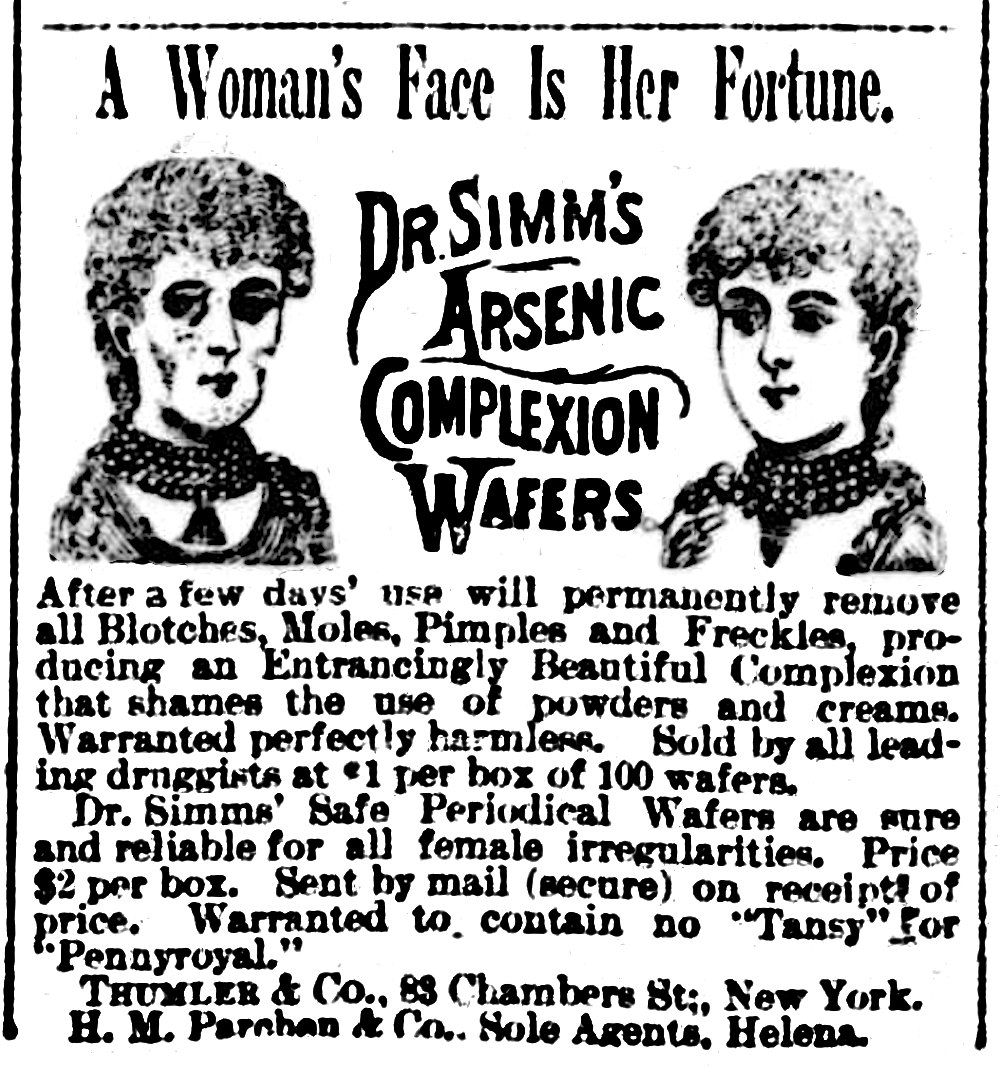
An 1889 U.S. newspaper ad for arsenic complexion wafers decried blotches, moles, pimples, freckles, and "all female irregularities". Arsenic was known to be poisonous during the Victorian era.

Research has attempted to determine which facial features communicate attractiveness. Facial symmetry has been shown to be considered attractive in women, and some men have been found to prefer full lips, high forehead, broad face, small chin, small nose, short and narrow jaw, high cheekbones, clear and smooth skin, and wide-set eyes. The shape of the face in terms of "how everything hangs together" is an important determinant of beauty. Women with thick, dark limbal rings in their eyes have also been found to be more attractive. The explanation given is that because the ring tends to fade with age and medical problems, a prominent limbal ring gives an honest indicator of youth.

In Persian literature, beautiful women are said to have noses like hazelnuts. In Arabian society in the Middle Ages, a component of the female beauty ideal was for women to have straight and fine noses.In Jewish Rabbinic literature, the rabbis considered a delicate nose to be the ideal type of nose for women. In Japan, during the Edo period, a component of the female beauty ideal was for women to have tall noses which were straight and not "too tall".

In a cross-cultural study, more neotenised (i.e., youthful looking) female faces were found to be most attractive to men while less neotenized female faces were found to be less attractive to men, regardless of the females' actual age. In a study of Italian women who have won beauty competitions, it was found that their faces had more "babyish" (pedomorphic) traits than those of the "normal" women used as a reference.

In a cross-cultural study, Marcinkowska et al. said that 18-to-45-year-old heterosexual men in all 28 countries surveyed preferred photographs of 18-to-24-year-old white women whose faces were feminised using facial image editing software over faces of 18-to-24-year-old white women that were masculinised using that software, but there were differences in preferences for femininity across countries. The higher the National Health Index (based on eight national health statistics taken from the World Health Organization Statistical Information Service using data from 2002 to 2006) of a country, the more were the feminised faces preferred over the masculinised faces. Among the countries surveyed, Japan had the highest femininity preference and Nepal had the lowest femininity preference.

Michael R. Cunningham of the Department of Psychology at the University of Louisville found, using a panel of East Asian, Hispanic and White judges, that the female faces tended to be judged as more attractive if they had a mixture of youthful and sexually mature features. Using a panel of African Americans and Whites as judges, Cunningham found more neotenous faces were perceived as having both higher "femininity" and "sociability". The authors found no evidence of ethnocentric bias in the Asian or White samples, as Asians and Whites did not differ significantly in preference for neonate cues, and positive ratings of White women did not increase with exposure to Western media.

Rather than finding evidence for purely "neonate" faces being most appealing, Cunningham found faces with "sexually-mature" features at the "periphery" of the face combined with "neonate" features in the "centre of the face" most appealing in women. Upon analyzing the results of his study, Cunningham concluded that preference for "neonate features may display the least cross-cultural variability" in terms of "attractiveness ratings" and, in another study, Cunningham concluded that there exists a large agreement on the characteristics of an attractive face.

In computer face averaging tests, women with averaged faces have been shown to be considered more attractive. This is possibly due to average features being more familiar and, therefore, more comfortable.

According to Chinese scholar Liu Jieyu (2008), there is more pressure on women than men to be physically attractive. Whereas there are various criteria that women might be expected to meet, a man might only need to be tall to be considered attractive.

On average, symmetrical features are one ideal, while unusual, stand-out features are another. A study performed by the University of Toronto found that the most attractive facial dimensions were those found in the average female face. However, that particular University of Toronto study looked only at white women.

A 2011 study, by Wilkins, Chan and Kaiser found correlations between perceived femininity and attractiveness; that is, women's faces which were seen as more feminine were judged by both men and women to be more attractive. The study also found that East Asian women's faces were more "prototypically" feminine than White women's, a finding that was replicated by several follow-up studies which found that this explains the higher attractiveness ratings of East Asian women compared to White women.

A component of the female beauty ideal in Persian literature is for women to have faces like a full moon.

Similarly, in Arabian society in the Middle Ages, a component of the female beauty ideal was for women to have round faces which were like a "full moon".

In Japan, during the Edo period, a component of the female beauty ideal was for women to have oval-shaped faces.

In Jewish Rabbinic literature, the rabbis considered full lips to be the ideal type of lips for women.

Historically, in Chinese and Japanese literature, the feminine ideal was said to include small lips. Women would paint their lips thinner and narrower to align with this ideal.

A study that used Chinese, Malay and Indian judges said that Chinese women and Chinese men with retrusive mandibles (where the mouth is flat and in-line with the rest of the face) were judged to be the most attractive and Chinese men and Chinese women with a protruding mandible (where the jaw projects outward) were judged to be the least attractive.

Classical Persian literature, paintings and miniatures portrayed traits such as long black curly hair, a small mouth, long arched eyebrows, large almond-shaped eyes, a small nose, and beauty spots as being beautiful for women.

==== Eyes ====
A study that investigated whether or not an eyelid crease makes Chinese-descent women more attractive using photo-manipulated photographs of young Chinese-descent women's eyes found that the "medium upper eyelid crease" was considered most attractive by all three groups of both sexes: white people, Chinese and Taiwanese nationals together as a group, and Taiwanese and Chinese Americans together as a group. Similarly, all three groups of both genders found the absence of an eye crease to be least attractive on Chinese women.

In the late sixteenth century, Japanese people considered epicanthic folds to be beautiful.

A study that used Russian, American, Brazilian, Aché, and Hiwi raters, found that the only strong distinguisher between men and women's faces was wider eyes relative to facial height for women, and this trait consistently predicted attractiveness ratings for women.

In Arabian society in the Middle Ages, a component of the female beauty ideal was for women to have dark black eyes which are large and long and in the shape of almonds. Furthermore, the eyes should be lustrous, and they should have long eyelashes.

A source written in 1823, said that a component of the Persian female beauty ideal was for women to have large eyes which are black in colour. In Persian literature, beautiful women are said to have eyes that are shaped like almonds.

In Chinese, the phrase "lucent irises, lustrous teeth" (Chinese: 明 眸 皓 齒) is used to describe a beautiful woman with "clear eyes" and "well-aligned, white teeth", and the phrase "moth-feeler eyebrows" (Chinese: 蛾眉) is used to denote a beautiful woman by describing her eyebrows as being thin and arched like moth antennae. In the Chinese text The Grotto of the Immortals (Chinese: 遊 仙 窟) written during the Tang dynasty period, narrow eyes were the preferred type of eyes for women, and, in the Chinese text Jeweled Chamber Secrets (Chinese: 玉 房 秘 訣) from the Six Dynasties period, the ideal woman was described as having small eyes.

The 1813 Japanese text Customs, Manners, and Fashions of the Capital (Japanese: 都 風 俗 化 粧 伝) indicates that large eyes were not considered attractive in women.

=== Breasts ===
Research has shown that most heterosexual men enjoy the sight of female breasts, with a preference for firm breasts. A study of British undergraduates found men preferred small breasts on women. Smaller breasts were widely associated with youthfulness. Cross-culturally, another study found significant variability regarding the ideal breast size.

The pigmentation of nipples and breasts appears to be the most important quality of breast attractiveness. Men rated women with dark nipples and dark areola as significantly more attractive than those with light-coloured nipples or areola. Breasts of medium cup size were found to be the most attractive, however it was noted that men focused primarily on the colouration of nipples and areola rather than breast size.

A study by Groyecka et al., in which they examined Poles and Yali of New Guinea, demonstrated that men's judgements of breast appearance are affected by the occurrence of breast ptosis (i.e., sagginess, droopiness). Greater breast ptosis (more sagging breasts) is perceived as less attractive and attributed to a woman of older age. These findings are consistent with previous research that link breast attractiveness with female youthfulness. Unlike breast size, breast ptosis seems to be a universal marker of female breast attractiveness.

A study showed that men prefer symmetrical breasts. Breast symmetry may be particularly sensitive to developmental disturbances and the symmetry differences for breasts are large compared to other body parts. Women who have more symmetrical breasts tend to have more children.

Historical literature often includes specific features of individuals or a gender that are considered desirable. These have often become a matter of convention, and should be interpreted with caution. In Arabian society in the Middle Ages, a component of the female beauty ideal was for women to have small breasts. In Persian literature, beautiful women are said to have breasts like pomegranates or lemons. In the Chinese text Jeweled Chamber Secrets (Chinese: 玉 房 秘 訣) from the Six Dynasties period, the ideal woman was described as having firm breasts. In Sanskrit literature, beautiful women are often said to have breasts so large that they cause the women to bend a little bit from their weight. In Middle English literature, beautiful women should have small breasts that are round like an apple or a pear.

=== Buttocks ===
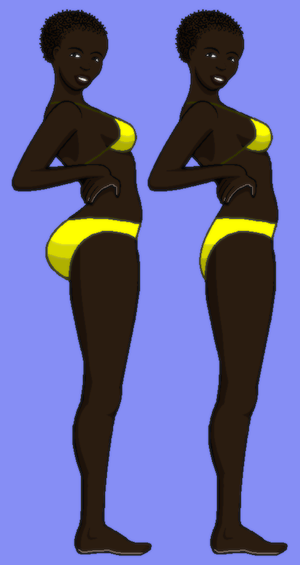
A remake of a drawing used to research perceptions of the most attractive size of posterior and breasts for white and black women

Biological anthropologist Helen E. Fisher of the centre for Human Evolution Studies in the Department of Anthropology of Rutgers University said that, "perhaps, the fleshy, rounded buttocks... attracted males during rear-entry intercourse." In a recent study, using 3D models and eye-tracking technology Fisher's claim was tested and it was shown that the slight thrusting out of a woman's back influences how attractive others perceive her to be and captures the gaze of both men and women. Bobbi S. Low et al. of the School of Natural Resources and Environment at the University of Michigan, said the female "buttocks evolved in the context of females competing for the attention and parental commitment of powerful resource-controlling males" as an "honest display of fat reserves" that could not be confused with another type of tissue, although T. M. Caro, professor in the centre for Population Biology and the Department of Wildlife, Fish, and Conservation Biology, at University of California, Davis, rejected that as being a necessary conclusion, stating that female fatty deposits on the hips improve "individual fitness of the female", regardless of sexual selection.

In a 1995 study, black men were more likely than white men to use the words "big" or "large" to describe their conception of an attractive woman's posterior. In a 2009 experiment to research what South African, British white and British African men considered to be the most attractive size of posterior and breasts for white and black women. This image shown here only shows the two extreme variations of size on black female figures used in the experiment. The left-hand figure received the highest average attractiveness rating from South African men while a figure with an intermediate size received the highest ratings from both white and black British men. The right-hand figure did not receive the highest average attractiveness rating from any group.

=== Body mass ===
Body Mass Index (BMI) is an important determinant to the perception of beauty. Even though the Western ideal is for a thin woman, some cultures prefer plumper women, which has been argued to support that attraction for a particular BMI merely is a cultural artifact. The attraction for a proportionate body also influences an appeal for erect posture. One cross-cultural survey comparing body-mass preferences among 300 of the most thoroughly studied cultures in the world showed that 81% of cultures preferred a female body size that in English would be described as "plump".

Availability of food influences which female body size is attractive which may have evolutionary reasons. Societies with food scarcities prefer larger female body size than societies that have plenty of food. In Western society, males who are hungry prefer a larger female body size than they do when not hungry.

BMI has been criticised for conflating fat and muscle, and more recent studies have concentrated on body composition. Among Australian university students, the most attractive body composition for women (10.31 kg fat, 42.45 kg muscle) was found to be lower in fat than both the most healthy appearing composition, and below the healthy range.

In the United States, women overestimate men's preferences for thinness in a mate. In one study, American women were asked to choose what their ideal build was and what they thought the build most attractive to men was. Women chose slimmer than average figures for both choices. When American men were independently asked to choose the female build most attractive to them, the men chose figures of average build. This indicates that women may be misled as to how thin men prefer women to be. Some researchers believe women themselves may play a role in enforcing the thinness ideal, however they assert that this does not mean that the ideal does not ultimately trace its origins to patriarchical norms (the "male gaze"). Popenoe writes that societies with abundant food sources often value thin women, while those with food scarcity value women with fat bodies. In the West, women with thin bodies became the ideal in the 19th century, as the fat body became associated with criminality and backwardness. Some implicated the fashion industry for the promulgation of the notion of thinness as attractive.

East Asians have historically preferred women whose bodies had small features. For example, during the Spring and Autumn period of Chinese history, women in Chinese harems wanted to have a thin body in order to be attractive for the Chinese emperor. Later, during the Tang dynasty, a less thin body type was seen as most attractive for Chinese women. In Arabian society in the Middle Ages, a component of the female beauty ideal was for women to be slender like a "cane" or a "twig". In the Chinese text Jeweled Chamber Secrets (Chinese: 玉 房 秘 訣) from the Six Dynasties period, the ideal woman was described as not being "large-boned".

In the Victorian era, women who adhered to Victorian ideals were expected to limit their food consumption to attain the ideal slim figure. In Middle English literature, "slender" women are considered beautiful.

According to research on females, women consider a full body with good distribution to be highly important to be considered attractive by men.

=== Waist–hip ratio ===
A WHR of 0.7 for women has been shown to correlate strongly with general health and fertility. Women within the 0.7 range have optimal levels of estrogen and are less susceptible to major diseases such as diabetes, heart disease, and ovarian cancers. Women with high WHR (0.80 or higher) have significantly lower pregnancy rates than women with lower WHRs (0.70–0.79), independent of their BMIs. Female waist-to-hip ratio (WHR) has been proposed by evolutionary psychologists to be an important component of human male mate choice, because this trait is thought to provide a reliable cue to a woman's reproductive value.

Both men and women judge women with smaller waist-to-hip ratios more attractive. Ethnic groups vary with regard to their ideal waist-to-hip ratio for women, ranging from 0.6 in China, to 0.8 or 0.9 in parts of South America and Africa, and divergent preferences based on ethnicity, rather than nationality, have also been noted. A study found the Machiguenga people, an isolated indigenous South American ethnic group, prefer women with high WHR (0.9). The preference for heavier women, has been interpreted to belong to societies where there is no risk of obesity.

In Chinese, the phrase "willow waist" (Chinese: 柳 腰) is used to denote a beautiful woman by describing her waist as being slender like a willow branch.

In the Victorian era, a small waist was considered the main trait of a beautiful woman. The term "wasp waist" describes an extreme fashion silhouette, produced by a style of corset and girdle.

=== Feet size ===
According to some studies, most men prefer women with small feet, such as in ancient China where foot binding was practiced.

In Jewish Rabbinic literature, the rabbis considered small feet to be the ideal type of feet for women.

=== Hair ===
Some studies have found that men tend to prefer long-haired women. One evolutionary psychology hypothesis suggests hair condition may function as a cue to health and nutritional status, since deficiencies in vitamins and minerals can affect hair quality and growth. Because hair grows slowly, its condition may reflect aspects of longer-term health. Across many cultures, healthy, shiny hair is often associated with attractiveness.

A component of the female beauty ideal in Persian literature is for women to have black hair, which was also preferred in Arabian society in the Middle Ages. In Middle English literature, curly hair is a necessary component of a beautiful woman.

=== Fertility-driven attractiveness ===
There are some subtle changes in women's perceived attractiveness across the menstrual cycle. During their most fertile phase, there are observable changes in women's behaviour and physiology. A study conducted by G. Miller (2007) examined the amount of tip earnings by lap dancers across the menstrual cycle. He found that dancers received nearly US$15 more when they were near ovulation than during the rest of the month. This suggests that women either are more attractive during ovulation phase, or they experience a significant change in their behaviour. Some other studies have found that there are subtle differences in women's faces when in their fertile phase. Bobst and Lobmaier (2012) created 20 prototyped photographs, some of a female during ovulation and some during the luteal phase. Men were asked to choose the more attractive, the more caring and the more flirtatious faces. They found a significant preference for the follicular phase (ovulation). This suggests that subtle shape differences in faces occurring during the female's ovulation phase are sufficient to attract men more. This idea is supported by another study, where a similar experiment was done. Men and women had to judge photographs of women's faces taken during their fertile phase. They were all rated more attractive than during non-fertile phase. There are some subtle visible cues to ovulation in women's faces, and they are perceived as more attractive, leading to the idea that it could be an adaptive mechanism to raise a female's mate value at that specific time (when probability of conception is at its highest).

Women's attractiveness, as perceived by men and women, slightly differs across her menstrual cycle, being at peak when a woman is in her ovulation phase. Jones et al. (2008), focused on women's preferences for masculinity, apparent health and self-resemblance and found that it varies across the cycle. They explained that the function of the effects of menstrual cycle phase on preferences for apparent health and self-resemblance in faces is to increase the likelihood of pregnancy.

Similarly, women prefer the scent of symmetrically faced men and men with masculine faces during fertile phases as well as stereotypical male displays such as social presence, and direct intrasexual competitiveness.

During the follicular phase (fertile), women prefer more masculine traits (testosterone dependent traits such as face shape) than when in non-fertile phase. Those findings have been found in the voice, showing that females' preferences for more masculine voices over feminine voices increase during the fertile phase of the menstrual cycle.

But not only do females' preferences vary across cycle, their behaviours can vary as well. Effectively, men respond differently to women when they are on ovulatory cycle, because women act differently. Women in the ovulatory phase are flirtier with men showing genetic fitness markers than in low fertile phase. It has been shown in some studies that women high in estrogen are generally perceived to be more attractive than women with low levels of estrogen, based on women not wearing make-up. High estrogen level women may also be viewed as healthier or to have a more feminine face.

Similarly, a study investigated the capacity of women to select high quality males based on their facial attractiveness. They found that facial attractiveness correlated with semen quality (good, normal, or bad depending on sperm morphology and motility). The more attractive a man's face is, linked to his sperm being of better quality.

=== Sexual ornamentation ===
Sexual ornaments are seen in many organisms; in humans, females have sexual ornamentation in the form of breasts and buttocks. The physical attraction to sexual ornaments is associated with gynoid fat, as opposed to android fat, which is considered unattractive. In human females, proximate causes of the development of sexual ornaments are associated with the predominance of estrogen in puberty. The activation of estrogen receptors around the female skeletal tissue causes gynoid fat to be deposited in the breasts, buttocks, hips and thighs, producing an overall typical female body shape. Specifically, female breasts are considered more attractive when symmetrical, rather than asymmetrical, as this is thought to reflect good developmental stability.

Sexual ornaments are considered attractive features as they are thought to indicate high mate value, fertility, and the ability to provide good care to offspring. They are sexually selected traits present for the purpose of honest signalling and capturing the visual attention of the opposite sex, most commonly associated with women capturing the visual attention of men. It has been proposed that these ornaments have evolved in order to advertise personal quality and reproductive value. Honest signalling with sexual ornaments is associated with ultimate causation of these evolved traits. The evolution of these ornaments is also associated with female-female competition in order to gain material benefits provided by resourceful and high status males. In humans, once these sexual ornaments develop, they are permanent. It is thought that this is associated with the long-term pair bonding humans engage in; human females engage in extended sexual activity outside of their fertile period. This relates to another ultimate cause of sexual ornaments with function in obtaining non-genetic material benefits from males. In other animal species, even other primate species, these advertisements of reproductive value are not permanent. Usually, it is the point at which the female is at her most fertile, she displays sexual swellings.

Adolescence is the period of time whereby humans experience puberty, and experience anatomical changes to their bodies through the increase of sex hormones released in the body. Adolescent exaggeration is the period of time at which sexual ornaments are maximised, and peak gynoid fat content is reached. In human females, the mean age for this is approximately 16 years. Female breasts develop at this stage not only to prepare for reproduction, but also due to competition with other females in displaying their reproductive value and quality to males.

== Neural correlates of perceiving attractiveness ==
Most studies of the brain activations associated with the perception of attractiveness show photographs of faces to their participants and let them or a comparable group of people rate the attractiveness of these faces. Such studies consistently find that activity in certain parts of the orbitofrontal cortex increases with increasing attractiveness of faces. This neural response has been interpreted as a reaction on the rewarding nature of attractiveness, as similar increases in activation in the medial orbitofrontal cortex can be seen in response to smiling faces and to statements of morally good actions. While most of these studies have not assessed participants of both genders or homosexual individuals, evidence from one study including male and female hetero- and homosexual individuals indicate that some of the aforementioned increases in brain activity are restricted to images of faces of the gender which participants feel sexually attracted to.

With regard to brain activation related to the perception of attractive bodies, one study with heterosexual participants suggests that activity in the nucleus accumbens and the anterior cingulate cortex increases with increasing attractiveness. The same study finds that for faces and bodies alike, the medial part of the orbitofrontal cortex responds with greater activity to both very attractive and very unattractive pictures. Recent research has found that the perception of women with lower Waist-to-Hip Ratios and larger breasts triggers distinct patterns of temporal and spatial brain activation, differing from those associated with larger WHRs and smaller breasts. Specifically, attractive WHRs and breast sizes influenced brain activity related to visual processing differently than less attractive WHRs and breast sizes, impacting both early and late stages of temporal processing in men and women. Moreover, research on upper body size shows that posterior brain regions are involved in perceiving body forms of differing attractiveness due to variations male upper body size, while frontal brain regions are engaged when these perceptions are explicitly rated. Such brain activities are unique to processing male, but not female, body sizes.

For both men and women, there appear to be universal criteria of attractiveness both within and across cultures and ethnic groups. When considering long-term relationships, some studies have found that men place a higher emphasis on physical attractiveness in a partner than women do. On the other hand, some studies have found few differences between men and women in terms of the weight they place on physical characteristics when they are choosing partners for short-term relationships, in particular with regard to their implicit, as opposed to explicitly articulated, preferences. Other recent studies continue to find sex differences for long-term relationships. While still valuing physical attractiveness, women tend to prioritise a man's status over his physical attractiveness, while men prioritise physical attractiveness over status. There is also one study suggesting that only men, not women, place greater priority on bodily compared to facial attractiveness when looking for a short-term as compared to a long-term partner.

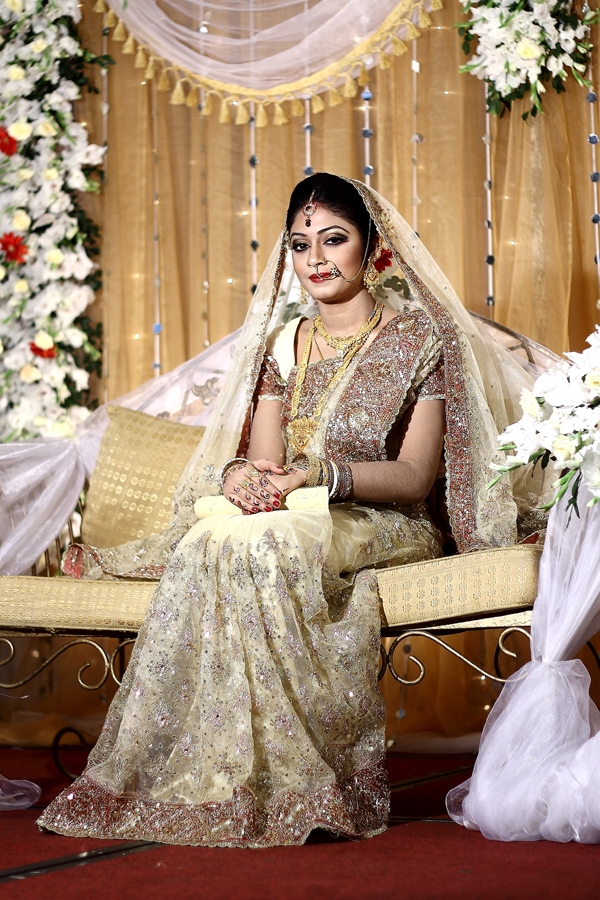
Bangladeshi bride exemplifying wedding day beauty

Some evolutionary psychologists, including David Buss, have argued that this long-term relationship difference may be a consequence of ancestral humans who selected partners based on secondary sexual characteristics, as well as general indicators of fitness which allowed for greater reproductive success as a result of higher fertility in those partners, although a male's ability to provide resources for offspring was likely signaled less by physical features. It is argued that the most prominent indicator of fertility in women is youth, while the traits in a man which enhance reproductive success are proxies for his ability to accrue resources and protect.

Studies have shown that women pay greater attention to physical traits than they do directly to earning capability or potential to commit, including muscularity, fitness and masculinity of features; the latter preference was observed to vary during a woman's period, with women preferring more masculine features during the late-follicular (fertile) phase of the menstrual cycle. Additionally, women process physical attractiveness differently, paying attention to both individual features and the aesthetic effect of the whole face.

According to Bonnie Adrian, Taiwanese brides place great importance on physical attractiveness for their wedding photographs. These brides go through hours of makeup to transform themselves into socially constructed beauty. Adrian notes that female beauty standards and practices in Taiwan are quite different from those found in the West. Women in Taiwan tend to avoid tanning, while Taiwanese women with tanned skin tones would be considered the ideal in the Western world.

According to strategic pluralism theory, men may have correspondingly evolved to pursue reproductive strategies that are contingent on their own physical attractiveness. More physically attractive men accrue reproductive benefits from spending more time seeking multiple mating partners and relatively less time investing in offspring. In contrast, the reproductive effort of physically less attractive men, who therefore will not have the same mating opportunities, is better allocated either to investing heavily in accruing resources, or investing in their mates and offspring and spending relatively less time seeking additional mates.

== Facial similarity and racial preferences ==
Research has suggested that people give high attractiveness ratings to same-sex people who look like them, but only in a nonsexual context. On the other hand, people generally do not find similar-looking people of the opposite sex to be sexually attractive. It is theorised that people may prefer sexual partners who look different from them, which is consistent with a pattern of inbreeding avoidance. Although one study found that individuals show a preference for similar-looking mates, after a physiological stress test they preferred dis-similar looking mates.

One study found no strong evidence for a same-race preference in heterosexual people, and they note that evidence from two similar studies is conflicting. Some racial groups show a strong preference for partners of a different race or ethnicity, and this preference may be gendered. One study suggested that attraction to people with different ethnic features may be related to the effects of heterozygosity, which are thought to be a fitness advantage.

A 2012 study using British raters found that Asian women's faces were rated as more feminine, and therefore more attractive, than White women's, which could explain the high rate of interracial marriage with Asian women. A 2018 facial manipulation experiment conducted in Australia was consistent with these hypotheses, finding both Asian and White participants chose to reduce Asian women's "masculine" facial traits less than White women's, which the authors conclude suggests that Asian faces may be more feminine to begin with.

In contrast, a 2013 Australian study on facial attractiveness with Asian and White participants found that Asian and White women's faces were not different in attractiveness overall, although a slight own-race bias was observed. However, when rating composite faces (the average of many faces, grouped by race, as opposed to real faces), all participants rated the composite faces more highly and rated White women's composite faces the highest. In a follow-up experiment, the researchers found that there was no difference in Asian and White women's perceived facial femininity.

A 2008 American study on female facial attractiveness with majority White participants (with a significant proportion of Asian, and few Black, Hispanic, or Middle-Eastern participants) found that White women's faces were rated most attractive. The study showed gradations of computer-generated racial mixes to the participants in increments of one-quarter. The top three rated faces were 100% White, 75% White 25% Black, and 75% White 25% Asian. To the researchers' surprise, Asian women's faces were rated significantly less attractive than White or Black faces in this study.

A 2012 study using Black and Caucasian subjects found that inter-ethnic and intra-ethnic differences in perceived male facial masculinity have no impact on attractiveness, and that skin colour plays a more important role in attractiveness assessments of male faces within groups, but not between groups as a health signal.

== Cheerleader effect ==
The cheerleader effect is where a group's overall attractiveness rating is higher than the mean of each individuals' attractiveness rating. This occurs because people selectively attend to the most attractive group members and thus they get the most attention. Men selectively attend to attractive people more than women, it has been suggested that this could be because men are less invested in their offspring, so they are less choosy when it comes to sexual partners, and therefore they are more easily attracted. As a result of selective attention, people end up giving a group rating which is biased as the rating focuses mainly on the attractive members and ignores the less attractive members. So the overall attractiveness rating is skewed towards more attractive. The cheerleader effect was investigated in a study which got participants to rate the physical attractiveness of a group of females as a whole, individually in a group, and individually on their own. Participants were asked to give a rating of 1–7, with 1 being very unattractive and 7 being very attractive. The cheerleader effect has been replicated with males as the main group and also with a group of both males and females. This effect may not be demonstrated across all cultures because the sample only contained Dutch university students.

== Social effects ==
Perceptions of physical attractiveness contribute to generalised assumptions based on those attractions. Individuals assume that when someone is beautiful, then they have many other positive attributes that make the attractive person more likeable. This is referred to as the halo effect, also known as the 'beautiful-is-good' effect. Across cultures, what is beautiful is assumed to be good; attractive people are assumed to be more extroverted, popular, and happy. This could lead to a self-fulfilling prophecy, as, from a young age, attractive people receive more attention that helps them develop these characteristics. In one study, beautiful people were found to be generally happier than less beautiful or plain people, perhaps because these outgoing personality traits are linked to happiness, or perhaps because beauty led to increased economic benefits which partially explained the increased happiness. In another study testing first impressions in 56 female and 17 male participants at University of British Columbia, personality traits of physically attractive people were identified more positively and more accurately than those who were less physically attractive. It was explained that people pay closer attention to those they find physically beautiful or attractive, and thus perceiving attractive individuals with greater distinctive accuracy. The study believes this accuracy to be subjective to the eye of the beholder. Recent results from the Wisconsin Longitudinal Study confirmed the positive link between psychological well-being and attractiveness (higher facial attractiveness, lower BMI) and also found the complementary negative association with distress/depression. Even though connections and confounds with other variables could not be excluded, the effects of attractiveness in this study were the same size as the ones for other demographic variables.

In developed western societies, women tend to be judged for their physical appearance over their other qualities and the pressure to engage in beauty work is much higher for women than men. Beauty work is defined as various beauty "practices individuals perform on themselves or others to elicit certain benefits from a specific social hierarchy." Being "beautiful" has individual, social and institutional rewards. Although marketers have started to target the "metro-sexual" male and produce hygiene and beauty products geared towards men, the expectations placed on them is less than women. The time and money required for a man to achieve the same well-groomed appearance is much lower. Even in areas that men also face pressure to perform beauty work, such as haircuts/styling, the prices discrepancy for products and services are skewed. This phenomenon is called the "pink tax."

However, attractiveness varies by society; in ancient China foot binding was practiced by confining young girls' feet in tightly bound shoes to prevent the feet from growing to normal size causing the women to have an attractive "lotus gait".

People make judgments of physical attractiveness based on what they see, but also on what they know about the person. Specifically, perceptions of beauty are malleable such that information about the person's personality traits can influence one's assessment of another person's physical beauty. A 2007 study had participants first rate pictures for attractiveness. After doing distracting math problems, participants saw the pictures again, but with information about the person's personality. When participants learned that a person had positive personality characteristics (e.g., smart, funny, kind), that person was seen as more physically attractive. Conversely, a person with negative personality characteristics (e.g., materialistic, rude, untrustworthy) was seen as less physically attractive. This was true for both females and males.

Physical attractiveness can have various social effects. For instance, humans tend to self-organise into couples where both parties have loosely similar attractiveness levels as judged by third parties. A survey conducted by London Guildhall University of 11,000 people showed that those who subjectively describe themselves as physically attractive earn more income than others who would describe themselves as less attractive. People who described themselves as less attractive earned, on average, 13% less than those who described themselves as more attractive, while the penalty for being overweight was around 5%. According to further research done on the correlation between looks and earnings in men, the punishment for unattractiveness is greater than the benefits of being attractive. However, in women the punishment is found to be equal to the benefits. Another study suggests that more physically attractive people are significantly more likely on average to earn considerably higher wages. Differences in income due to attractiveness was much more pronounced for men rather than women, and held true for all ranges of income. In the US the earnings disparities along the attractiveness continuum (net of controls) are similar or greater than the black-white disparity. A study from 2020 found that social scientists who are judged as being more attractive receive higher public speaking fees than less attractive social scientists, whereas for natural scientists, relative unattractiveness is a comparative advantage in terms of public speaking fees.

Other factors such as self-confidence may explain or influence these findings as they are based on self-reported attractiveness as opposed to any sort of objective criteria; however, as one's self-confidence and self-esteem are largely learned from how one is regarded by their peers while maturing, even these considerations would suggest a significant role for physical appearance. One writer speculated that "the distress created in women by the spread of unattainable ideals of female beauty" might possibly be linked to increasing incidence of depression.

Many have asserted that certain advantages tend to come to those who are perceived as being more attractive, including the ability to get better jobs and promotions; receiving better treatment from authorities and the legal system; having more choices in romantic or platonic partners and, therefore, more power in relationships; and marrying into families with more money. Those who are attractive are treated and judged more positively than those who are considered unattractive, even by those who know them. Also, attractive individuals behave more positively than those who are unattractive. One study found that teachers tend to expect that children who are attractive are more intelligent, and are more likely to progress further in school. They also consider these students to be more popular. Voters choose political candidates who are more attractive over those who are less attractive. Men and women use physical attractiveness as a measure of how "good" another person is. In 1946, Soloman Asch coined the Implicit Personality Theory, meaning that the presence of one trait tends to imply the existence of other traits. This is also known as the halo effect. Research suggests that those who are physically attractive are thought to have more socially desirable personalities and lead better lives in general. This is also known as the "what-is-beautiful-is-good effect" or physical attractiveness stereotype. Discrimination against or prejudice towards others based on their appearance is sometimes referred to as lookism (prejudice or discrimination based on physical appearance and especially physical appearance believed to fall short of societal notions of beauty).

Some researchers conclude that little difference exists between men and women in terms of sexual behaviour. Other researchers disagree. Symmetrically faced men and women have a tendency to begin to have sexual intercourse at an earlier age, to have more sexual partners, to engage in a wider variety of sexual activities, and to have more one-night stands. They are also prone to infidelity and are more likely to have open relationships. Additionally, they have the most reproductive success. Therefore, their physical characteristics are most likely to be inherited by future generations.

Concern for improving physical attractiveness has led many persons to consider alternatives such as cosmetic surgery. It has led scientists working with related disciplines such as computer imaging and mathematics to conduct research to suggest ways to surgically alter the distances between facial features in order to make a face conform more closely to the "agreed-upon standards of attractiveness" of an ideal face by using algorithms to suggest an alternative which still resembles the current face. One research study found that cosmetic surgery as a way to "boost earnings" was "not profitable in a monetary sense." Some research shows that physical attractiveness has a marginal effect on happiness.

== Misconceptions ==
=== The golden ratio ===
The golden ratio, also known as the golden proportion, was considered the perfect measurement of harmony, beauty and proportion in Ancient Greece. Researchers Mohammad Khursheed Alam, Nor Farid Mohd Noor, Rehana Basri, Tan Fo Yew and Tay Hui Wen conducted a study to test if the golden ratio was a contributor to perceptions of facial attractiveness in various ethnic groups. A total of 286 people aged 18 to 25 participated in the survey, including 100 Malay (50 male, 50 female), 100 Malaysian Chinese (50 male, 50 female), and 86 Malaysian Indian (36 male, 50 female). This study excluded subjects of mixed race, those with craniofacial deformities, and those who had previously received orthodontic treatment or had face surgery. The results showed that the golden ratio had no significant association with physical attractiveness.

=== Ideal body shape for women ===
Some argue that body type preference is a mark of culture and regional beauty standards, and that there is no definitive "ideal body" for women, because it constantly shifts. Some authors argue that body types have never been universal and that most evolutionary psychology studies on the "ideal female body" shape have been questioned or disproven due to external factors such as unreliable data and idealized western gender roles. On the internet, communities can create their own niche beauty standards that differ from the cultural norm. It has been argued that the "perfect body" is a matter of personal preference and exposure to regional media.

== See also ==
- Adornment – Accessory or ornament worn to enhance the beauty or status of the wearer
- Body proportions – Proportions of the human body in art
  - Artistic canons of body proportions – Criteria used in formal figurative art
- Body shape – General shape of a human body
  - Male body shape – Male musculo-skeletal characteristics
  - Female body shape – Characteristic of human females
- Circassian beauties – Ethnic stereotype
- Cultural views on the navel
- Cuteness – Subjective physical trait
- Dating preferences – Preferences in romantic partners
- Feminine beauty ideal – Socially constructed norms
- The Honest Body Project – Collection of pictures of real women
- Human physical appearance – Look, outward phenotype
- Koinophilia – Hypothesis on normative mate selection
- Looksmaxxing – Neologism from online manosphere communities
- Masculine beauty ideal – Socially constructed norms
- Matching hypothesis – Mate selection by social desirability
- Ovulatory shift hypothesis – Hypothesis of female mating behavior
- Sexual attraction – Attraction on the basis of sexual desire
- Sexual capital – Social value from sexual attractiveness
- Sexual fetishism – Sexual arousal a person receives from an object or situation
