= Reproductive value =

Reproductive value may refer to several ideas:

- Reproductive value (social psychology), the attributes of a potential partner in mate selection
- Reproductive value (population genetics), the contribution of an individual to the future generations
