= Near miss (disambiguation) =

In safety, a near miss is an unplanned event that did not result in injury, illness, or damage – but had the potential to do so.

Near miss may also refer to:

- Near Miss, an American punk band

== See also ==
- Near-miss effect, a psychological effect in gambling
- Near-Earth object, an asteroid or meteorite that barely misses the earth or another body
- Near-miss Johnson solid, a type of geometric shape
