= Face superiority effect =

Process of memorising faces

In psychology, the face superiority effect refers to the holistic way in which the human mind perceives and encodes human faces into memory. Rather than processing all individual facial features individually (nose, eyes, mouth, etc), faces are perceived and encoded as one unified element. This aids the visual system in recognizing thousands of distinct faces, a task that would be difficult if it were necessary to recognize sets of individual features and characteristics. However, this effect is limited to perceiving upright faces and does not occur when a face is at an unusual angle, such as when faces are upside-down or contorted in phenomena like the Thatcher effect and Pareidolia.

== Early history ==
In 1879, Galton's research was some of the first to indicate that the face is “the sum of a multitude of small details, which are viewed in such rapid succession that we seem to perceive them all at a single glance.” This innate “holistic” perception is one of the main factors that differentiates face recognition from object recognition. To test this and further face superiority research in general, Tanaka and Farah conducted a study where they assessed individuals’ ability to recognize facial features holistically. Participants were given an allotment of time to study several faces and then were tested on their ability to recognize one feature of the face. As the researchers predicted, participants were better able to recognize the feature when it was presented with the whole face, rather than when it was presented in isolation.

Other studies confirming the holistic processing theory involve the inversion condition, similar to the Thatcher Effect, where inverted, distorted, or disoriented faces are not as easily recognized. Yin's 1969 research demonstrated this and supported his hypothesis which stated that familiar faces would not be recognized if the face is presented at an inverted state. While most objects in general are difficult to recognize when inverted, Yin exhibited that inverted faces caused a particular impairment in recognition. Similarly, the Thatcher Effect presents a face that is both distorted and upside-down, which individuals typically can't detect until they are presented the same image right-side-up, and are then able to see the obvious contortions.

== Neuroscience behind face superiority ==
Evidence from neurophysiology studies with humans and monkeys also support face superiority. Neuroimaging and electrophysiological studies in humans shows the effects of holistic face recognition. In particular, when humans are shown normal upright faces, neuroimaging displays higher brain activity and response rates in the middle fusiform gyrus (MFG), and the inferior occipital gyrus (IOG) than when shown scrambled or inverted faces. Additionally, experiments computing event-related scalp potentials (ERPs) reveal higher brain responses 180ms after presenting the normal face, than in inverted/scrambled conditions.

Additionally, research from Riesenhuber, Jarudi, Gilad, & Sinha, 2004; K. Tanaka, Saito, Fukada, & Moriya, 1991; and K. Tanaka, 1996 also supports face superiority, where they demonstrate that face parts and wholes are similar to other hierarchical visual processes, in that the stimulation of simple features leads to the stimulation of complex features. This “feed-forward” theory states that the part-face information precedes and leads into the whole-face perception. However, the reverse model of this hierarchy states that the perception of the whole face leads to the perception of the parts.

== Prosopagnosia face blindness ==
Prosopagnosia is a "selective impairment in the ability to recognize individual faces due to brain damage of the visual cortex." Essentially, this neurological deficit impairs an individual's ability to recognize faces, even faces of those who should be familiar, such as family members. This is the result of damage to the visual cortex. In terms of the holistic view, the inability to recognize faces stems from a failure to integrate the individual face parts into a whole. A study done by Busigny, Joubert, Felician, Ceccaldi, & Rossion (2010) looked at a prosopagnosia patient, GG, in reference to unimpaired control participants in matching/recognition tasks. Participants were either asked to study a whole face and select a part from the studied face presented in isolation, or study an isolated part and then select the same part when presented in a whole face. The researchers hypothesized that holistic interference would be demonstrated in the "part-to-whole" and "whole-to-part" conditions relative to the "part-to-part" and "whole-to-whole" conditions. These results were confirmed in the control participants, however, patient GG performed equally well in both conditions. The researchers suggest this is due to her recognition of face parts is unaffected by surrounding facial features in encoding or retrieving it from memory. Similar studies have also been conducted to show that prosopagnosia results from an individual's inability to form a holistic facial representation.

== Sequential lineup superiority effect ==
In criminology, the sequential lineup superiority effect refers to the process presented to eye-witnesses during criminal investigations that has to do with suspect "line ups". This can include the use of photographs of multiple individuals including a suspect (or absent of one), or a line up with living members in an effort to identify a suspect of a crime. It is used mainly to assist eye-witnesses more accurately decide on an individual within the line up who most represents the suspects description. The Sequential Lineup process includes a system that shows only one suspect (photograph or live person) at a time, and forcing a decision from the witness viewing the lineup. According to the research done by Steblay, Nancy, Dysart, Jennifer, and Wells, Gary L., there were fewer incidents of false identifications when the Sequential Lineup method was used.
