= Behavioral contrast =

Phenomenon studied in psychology

Behavioral contrast refers to a change in the strength of one response that occurs when the rate of reward of a second response, or of the first response under different conditions, is changed. For example, suppose that a pigeon in an operant chamber pecks a key for food reward. Sometimes the key is red, sometimes green, but food comes with equal frequency in either case. Then suddenly pecking the key when it is green brings food less frequently. Positive contrast is seen when the rate of response to the red key goes up, even though the frequency of reward in red remains unchanged. Likewise, increasing the reward to green tends to reduce the response rate to red (negative contrast). This sort of contrast effect may occur following changes in the amount, frequency, or nature of the reward, and it has been shown to occur with various experimental designs and response measures (e.g. response rate, running speed).

== History of contrast effects ==
In 1942, Crespi measured the speed of rats running to various amounts of reward at the end of an alley. He found that the greater the magnitude of reward, the faster the rat would run to get the reward. In the middle of his experiment Crespi shifted some of his animals from a large reward to a small reward. These animals now ran even more slowly than control animals that had been trained on small reward throughout the experiment. This overshoot is an example of successive negative contrast. Likewise, other animals shifted from small to large reward ran faster than those trained on the larger reward throughout (successive positive contrast). Crespi originally called these effects depression and elation respectively, but, in 1949, Zeaman suggested changing the names to negative contrast and positive contrast. The combined concept of behavioral contrast is sometimes also referred to as the Crespi effect.

In 1981, Bower discovered that positive contrast may be reduced because the response measure hits a ceiling. Thus, if contrast is the subject of an experiment, reward sizes may need to be adjusted to keep the response below such a ceiling. In 1996, Flaherty suggested that negative contrast was related to frustration; that is, the sudden shift to a low reward causes frustration for the person or the animal, and this frustration interferes with the behavior the subject is performing.
