= Association splitting =

Self-help technique for people with OCD

Association splitting is a self-help technique for people with obsessive-compulsive disorder (OCD).

== Technique ==
In this method, to provide competition to the existing negative associations typical of OCD (e.g. cancer = death), alternative neutral or positive associations are strengthened or newly established (e.g., cancer = zodiac sign). The strengthening of neutral or positive associations is aimed to weaken dysfunctional associations (fan-effect) in order to attenuate compulsive urges (e.g., washing, checking).

The technique is based on semantic network models as well as studies showing that mental associations in patients with OCD are restricted to the obsessive-compulsive meaning. A systematic review found evidence for the efficacy of the technique. The manual for the technique is available online in seven languages. A short instruction of the technique as well as a related method (attention splitting), which aims to attenuate the over-focusing of external stimuli, is part of a metacognitive self-help (myMCT), which leads to a significant improvement of OCD symptoms according to a meta-analysis.
