= Leo P. Crespi =

American psychologist

Leo P. Crespi (1916–2008) was an American psychologist who directed public opinion research for the United States Information Agency.

Crespi graduated from UCLA in 1937, and earned a Ph.D. from Princeton in 1942 in the field of comparative psychology. During his time as a graduate student, he discovered what has come to be known as the Crespi Effect: when the attractiveness of a reward is suddenly changed, this can temporarily influence performance more than one would expect from the size of the change in the reward.

After his graduation, Crespi taught on the faculty at Princeton. During this time he became involved in public opinion research. One early survey, "The Implications of Tipping in America," examined the psychology of tipping behavior, finding that most people tip out of a sense of social obligation and would rather see the practice abolished. He also contributed a chapter supporting the methodology behind Alfred C. Kinsey's sexual behavior studies to the book "Sex Habits of American Men" in 1948.

Crespi left Princeton to work for the United States government, surveying European public opinion in postwar Germany. He returned to Washington in 1954 to head a worldwide program of opinion surveys for the newly-formed United States Information Agency, where he would work for 32 years. In 1962, Crespi received a Superior Service Award from USIA Director Edward R. Murrow for “making a unique and original contribution to the conduct of United States foreign information activities by his pioneering use of surveys.” From 1955–1956 he also served as President of the World Association of Public Opinion Research.

Much of Crespi's work at USIA was classified. His most widely reported work was a survey of French and British opinions about the US and Soviet Union, which was leaked to the New York Times and printed in its entirety on October 27, 1960, less than 2 weeks before the 1960 US Presidential election. John F. Kennedy had been arguing that US prestige was declining abroad, and the leaked survey supported Kennedy's arguments.
