= Catherine Tinsley =

American academic

Catherine H. Tinsley
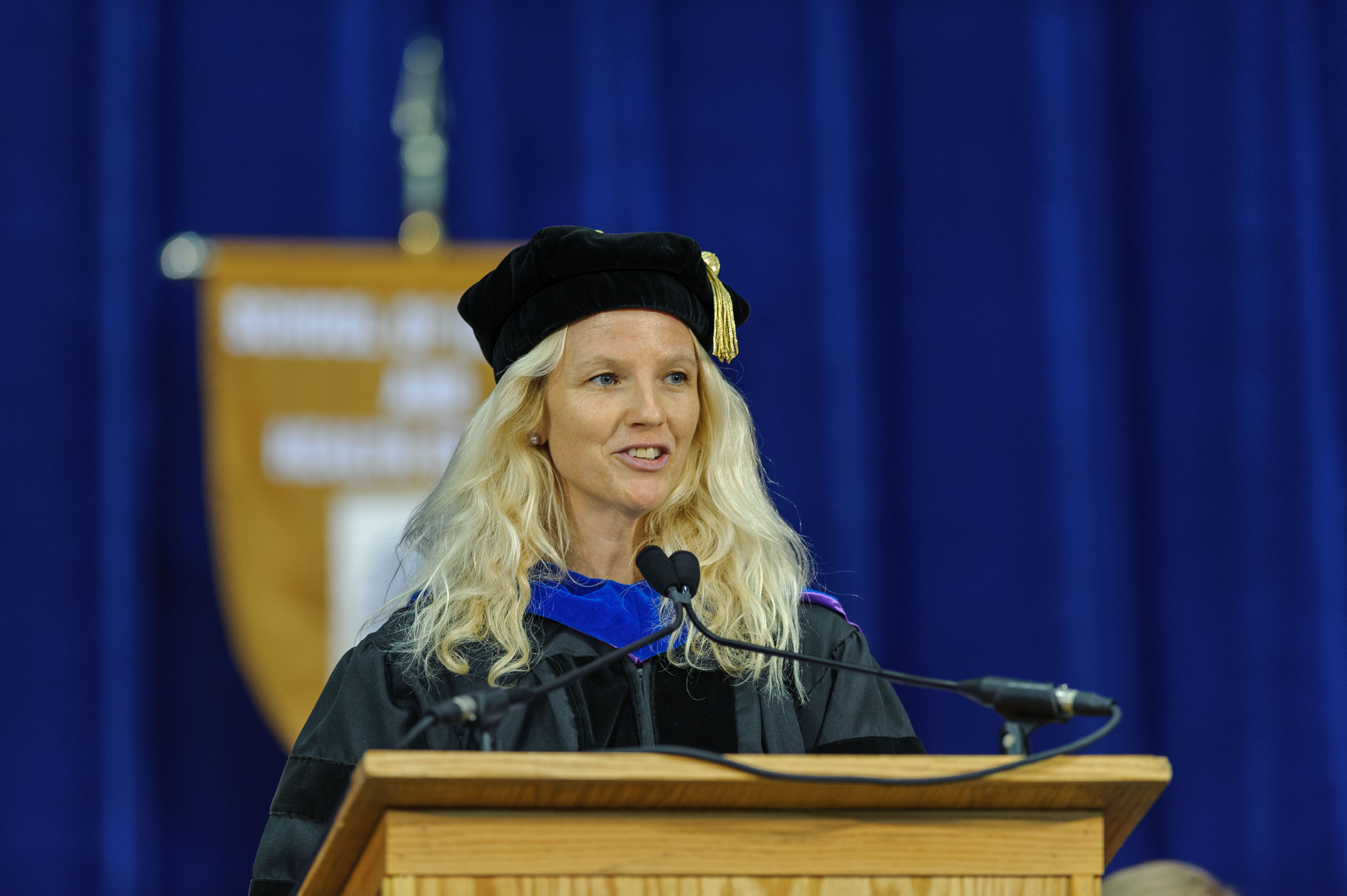
- Citizenship: American
- Occupation: Raffini Professor of Management
- Spouse: John Mayo
- Children: Christopher and Nicholas Higgins

Academic background
- Education: Bryn Mawr College (BA); Kellogg School of Management, Northwestern University (MS, PhD)

Academic work
- Discipline: Organizational behavior
- Sub-discipline: Negotiation, decision-making, risk perception, gender in the workplace
- Institutions: Georgetown University; Hong Kong University of Science and Technology

Catherine H. Tinsley is an American organizational scholar and professor whose research focuses on negotiation, evidence-based decision-making, risk perception, and gender dynamics in the workplace. The common theme uniting these different domains is exploring what people and organizations systematically overlook: hidden assumptions that drive decisions, invisible patterns in bias and risk, latent dangers that normalize into disasters, and the shadow side of organizations. She is the Raffini Professor of Management at Georgetown University’s McDonough School of Business, where she serves as Area Head for the Management Faculty and Faculty Director of the Georgetown University Women's Leadership Institute.

== Early life and education ==
Tinsley earned a Bachelor of Arts in anthropology in May 1986, graduating magna cum laude from Bryn Mawr College.

She did her graduate studies at the Kellogg Graduate School of Management at Northwestern University. In 1993, she specialized in organizational behavior, completing a Master of Science degree in 1993. In June 1995, she earned her Ph.D. in organizational behavior.

== Academic career ==
Tinsley joined the Georgetown University faculty in 1996. Prior to joining Georgetown, she served on the faculty of the Hong Kong University of Science and Technology, where she conducted research and taught in the field of organizational behavior.

At Georgetown's McDonough School of Business, she has served as a professor of management and has held leadership roles as Area Head for the Management Faculty and Faculty Director of the Georgetown University Women's Leadership Institute.

Tinsley has also served on three committees for the National Academy of Sciences: the Committee to Improve Intelligence Analysis for National Security, the Committee on Unifying Social and Cultural Frameworks in the Military, and the Committee on The Context of Military Environments, where she served as committee vice-chair.

== Research ==
Tinsley studies negotiation, organizational behavior, judgment, and decision-making in complicated social and organizational situations, focusing on culture, gender, and risk perception.

=== Culture ===
Tinsley’s research examines how cultural differences influence cognition, communication, and behavior in negotiation and organizational settings. Her work shows that individuals from different cultural backgrounds may rely on implicit assumptions about appropriate and effective behavior, which can lead to misunderstanding.

Empirical work has examined differences in negotiation and conflict management across national contexts, including the United States, Hong Kong, Japan, Germany, and China.

Additional studies address cultural differences in negotiation strategies and joint outcomes.

Her research also finds that individuals may overestimate cultural differences, which can contribute to reduced cooperation in cross-cultural interactions.

=== Risk perception ===
Another area of research concerns risk perception, near-miss events, and decision-making under uncertainty. Tinsley has conducted extensive research on how near-misses are hidden warnings of future disasters because they are often overlooked by individuals and organizations. But individuals and organizations can learn to use these signals with appropriate risk communication and other organizational systems that improve recognition of emerging threats.

=== Gender and workplace inequality ===
Tinsley has also contributed to research on gender, leadership, and workplace inequality. Her work examines gender differences in negotiation outcomes, the effects of stereotypes on evaluation and career advancement, and invisible structural barriers affecting women in leadership and labor markets. Her research on backlash effects has been influential, demonstrating that women face social and financial penalties when they behave assertively in negotiations, though this effect can be mitigated by situational factors and mental models of successful women.

Tinsley has worked in partnership with the U.S. State Department and the Council of Women World Leaders to convene the first-ever worldwide meeting of the Ministers of Women's Affairs. She has been quoted in media outlets including U.S. News & World Report and Harvard Business Review on topics related to gender and leadership.

=== Group dynamics and organizational processes ===
Another stream of her research addresses group dynamics, organizational processes, and social cognition. She has studied subgroup formation and team processes, the effects of status and structure on decision-making in organizations, and how individuals respond to feedback, disagreement, and opposing viewpoints.

== Awards and honors ==
- 2026 – Impact on Management Accounting Practice Award from the American Institute of Certified Public Accountants and the Chartered Institute of Management Accountants
- 2016 – Featured Favorite Professor, Poets & Quants
- May 2013 – Dean's Distinguished Research Award, McDonough School of Business
- August 2010 – Most Influential Article (2002–2006) Award, Conflict Management Division, Academy of Management
- June 2010 – Best Published Article in Negotiation and Conflict Management Research (2009), International Association for Conflict Management
- May 2005 – Dean's Distinguished Research Award, McDonough School of Business
- August 2005 – Distinguished Service Award, Conflict Management Division, Academy of Management
- August 1998 – Editorial Board's Highest Quality Comments Award, Academy of Management Journal
- August 1996 – Best Student Paper Award, Conflict Management Division, Academy of Management
- May 1994 – Doctoral Teaching Award, Kellogg Graduate School of Management

=== Fellowships and early career distinctions ===
- June 1994 – Hubert H. Humphrey Dissertation Fellowship Award, U.S. Arms Control Agency

=== Editorial service ===
Tinsley serves on the editorial board of Organizational Behavior and Human Decision Processes, International Negotiations: A Journal of Theory and Practice, and the International Journal of Conflict Management. She is a past editorial board member of the Academy of Management Journal.

== Selected publications ==
- Hagmann, D., Minson, J. A., & Tinsley, C. H. (2024). Personal narratives build trust across ideological divides. Journal of Applied Psychology, 109(11), 1693–1715.
- Lang, M. E., Soule, E., & Tinsley, C. H. (2024). Psychology, soft skills, or cash? Evidence on marginal investments. Economic Development and Cultural Change, 73(1).
- Cronin, M., Erkens, D. H., Schloetzer, J., & Tinsley, C. H. (2021). How controlling failure perceptions affects performance: Evidence from a field experiment. The Accounting Review, 96(2), 205–230.
- Kugler, A. D., Tinsley, C. H., & Ukhaneva, O. (2021). Gender and choice of majors: Are women really different from men? Economics of Education Review, 81, 102079.
- Minson, J., Chen, F., & Tinsley, C. H. (2020). Why won't you listen to me? Measuring receptiveness to opposing views. Management Science, 66(7), 3069–3094.
- Tinsley, C., Wade, J., Main, B. G. M., & O'Reilly, C. A. (2017). Gender diversity on U.S. corporate boards: Are we running in place? Industrial and Labor Relations Review, 70(1), 160–189.
- Dillon-Merrill, R., Tinsley, C., Madsen, P. M., & Rogers, E. W. (2016). Organizational correctives for improving recognition of near-miss events. Journal of Management, 42(3), 671–697.
- Aslani, S., Ramirez-Marin, J., Brett, J. M., Yao, J., Semnani-Azad, Z., Zhang, Z., Tinsley, C., & Weingart, L. R. (2016). Dignity, face, and honor cultures: A study of negotiation strategy and outcomes in three cultures. Journal of Organizational Behavior, 37(8), 1178–1201.
- Tinsley, C. H., Howell, T., & Amanatullah, E. T. (2015). How gender-deterministic views constrain spousal wage preferences. Organizational Behavior and Human Decision Processes, 126, 37–48.
- Tinsley, C. H., Dillon, R. L., & Cronin, M. A. (2012). How near-miss events amplify or attenuate risky decision making. Management Science, 58(9), 1596–1613.
- Dillon, R. L., Tinsley, C. H., & Burns, W. (2014). Near-misses and future disaster preparedness. Risk Analysis, 34(10), 1907–1922.
- Amanatullah, E. T., & Tinsley, C. H. (2013). Punishing female negotiators for asserting too much... or not enough: Exploring why advocacy moderates backlash against assertive female negotiators. Organizational Behavior and Human Decision Processes, 120(1), 110–122.
- Tinsley, C. H., O'Connor, K. M., & Sullivan, B. A. (2002). Tough guys finish last: The perils of a distributive reputation. Organizational Behavior and Human Decision Processes, 88(2), 621–642.
- Davis, G. F., Diekmann, K. A., & Tinsley, C. H. (1994). The decline and fall of the conglomerate firm in the 1980s: The deinstitutionalization of an organizational form. American Sociological Review, 59(4), 547–570.
