= Assembly bonus effect =

First proposed in 1964, an assembly bonus effect requires a demonstration of group performance which exceeds the most capable group member or the combined contributions of individual group members. There is evidence for both task-specific assembly bonus effects, and a general effect of collective intelligence, analogous to that of general intelligence.

== Theories and studies ==
After Collins and Guetzkow proposed the assembly bonus effect in a theoretical piece in 1964, Michaelsen and colleagues (1989) provided the first empirical support by comparing the group's performance to the performance of the best individual group member in the same course examination under a realistic context. During the testing process, participants initially complete the tests individually and immediately retake the same test as groups, where both individual and group tests were accounted for the course grade. There were a series of multiple-choice and true/false questions for each individual/group, and their cumulative scores were calculated and compared. Results showed that most groups outperformed their best members (215/222), which confirmed the assembly bonus effect.

However, Tindale and Larson (1992) argued that the level of analysis should be focused on simple items comprising the test rather than the overall scores. Specifically, when looking at a particular question, a group might collectively generate the correct answer where no individual group members did correct in the pretest, demonstrating a clear assembly bonus effect. Based on Michaelsen and colleagues' findings, Tindale and Larson analyzed the data by looking at how well each person performed on individual questions. They applied the truth wins model as the baseline model of group interaction, predicting that if at least one group member answered correctly to a specific test item, the entire group would be considered to have answered correctly. They then combined the best scores for each person and compared this total to the group's overall score. Results found that, according to item-by-item analysis, the group's performance never reached the expectation of the truth wins model.

These findings were further supported by Stasson and Bradshaw, who concluded that the assembly bonus effect could be observed at an aggregate score level of analysis but not when analyzing at the level of individual items.

Another study on collective intelligence underlined the assembly bonus effect, where a general collective intelligence factor (c) has been found within groups through a diverse set of complex tasks (e.g. solving visual puzzles and making collective moral judgments). Collective intelligence could predict the group performance on different tasks rather than the individual group members' average and maximum intelligence scores. By leveraging the synergies and interactions among group members, collective intelligence enables groups to tap into shared knowledge, diverse perspectives, and effective collaboration, leading to enhanced performance that goes beyond what would be expected based on individual capabilities alone.

== Conditions favoring finding assembly bonus effect ==
=== Differentiated expertise between group members ===
In group settings, members possess non-overlapping areas of knowledge that complement each other's weaknesses. Aligned with Michaelsen et al.'s findings, the assembly bonus effect would be observed when considering the overall performance, as certain members in the group may compensate for the lack of expertise of the top performer.

=== Outcomes are designed to reward differentiation ===
Several studies have mentioned the importance of external motivators in reaching the assembly bonus effect in groups, especially the differentiated incentives. There is a specific example of group performance in terms of information recall. Hollingshead has pointed out four types of incentives to motivate group members to both learn their unique expertise and coordinate with members to integrate in order to achieve better overall information recall.

=== Equal conversational dynamics ===
Groups with an equal distribution of conversational turn-taking were more likely to have high collective intelligence. In group work, findings suggested that people should avoid the condition where a few group members dominate the conversation.

=== High social sensitivity ===
According to the 'Reading the Mind in the Eyes" test, researchers found the average social sensitivity of group members is positively correlated to collective intelligence. The group composition of a high proportion of females also contributes to higher collective intelligence, while females score higher on social sensitivity.

== Criticism and future directions ==
In previous studies, researchers have often utilized traditional baseline models, such as the truth wins model, to calculate the combination of individual performance and compare it with group performance to ascertain whether the groups achieved an assembly bonus effect. However, this model restricted the studies to intellective tasks that involved definite answers (e.g., multiple choice) to calculate accurate scores. The more complex tasks (e.g. judgmental tasks) that require a further integration of member’s knowledge to form new information cannot be explored.

Since the publication of the original study, many studies have opposed the assembly bonus effect by providing evidence of process loss during group work instead of process gain. Until now, it is still a controversial topic whether groups outperformed the combinations of individuals. Future studies on the assembly bonus effect can focus on group performance in more complex tasks that are more common in real-life situations to see if the assembly bonus effect could be identified on either item-by-item or aggregate levels and corresponding reasons.
