= Crespi effect =

Behavioural contrast phenomenon

The Crespi effect is a behavioural contrast phenomenon observed in classical conditioning in which a conditioned response changes disproportionately to a suddenly changed reinforcement. It was first observed in rats by American psychologist Leo P. Crespi in 1942.

He found that in a repeatedly carried out task such as finding food in a maze, the running speed of the rat is proportional to the size of the reward it obtained on the previous trial. The more food reward that was given to it last time upon completion of the task, the faster it will run when attempting to complete the same task. The effect also works in reverse: when rats were shifted from a larger to a smaller reward, they ran more slowly than the control rats that had always received the small reward.

The size of the reward has little or no influence on the speed of learning, but it does have an influence on the performance of tasks already learned.

Scholars have been only partially able to replicate Crespi's studies, which remains controversial.

== See also ==
- Contrast effect
