= Near-miss effect =

Psychological effect in gambling

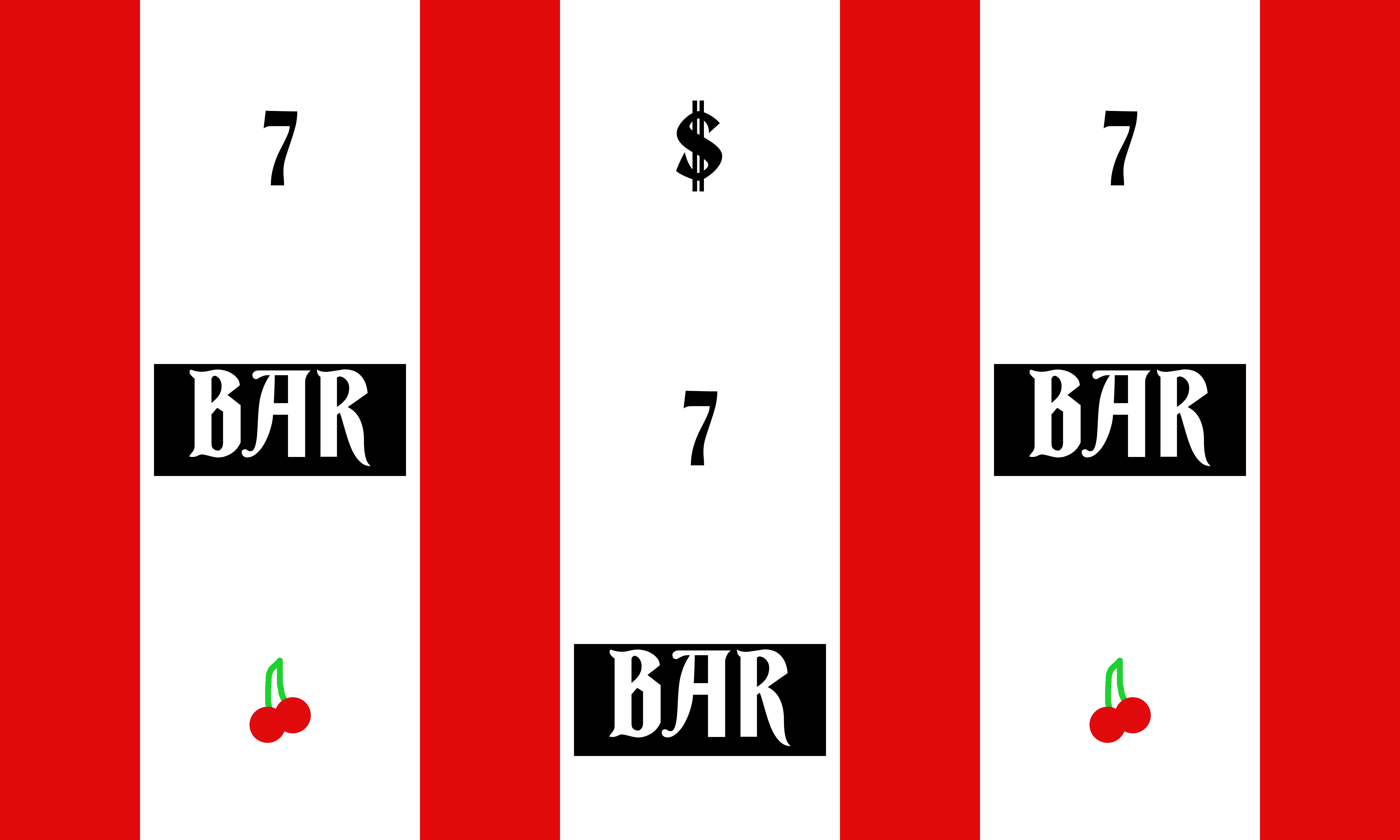
Illustration of a slot machine with near-miss.

The near-miss effect refers to when a player becomes more motivated to continue expending effort because the previous effort "almost succeeded". It occurs in many endeavors, especially sports, but is highly documented and studied in gambling.

== Psychology ==
The near-miss effect is boosted by conditional reinforcement and personal control. It stimulates reward-related parts of the brain such as the ventral striatum, and can increase heart rate and dopamine transmission in the brain, with the stimuli causing the feeling that the gambler is close to a win.

By stimulating the "win" response, conditional reinforcement, which is only useful in games of skill, may lead a gambler to temporarily mistake a game of luck for a game of skill. For instance, a soccer player who takes a shot and hits the goalpost may legitimately feel encouraged to shoot again, as they perceive the near miss as evidence that they are shooting well that day, the defenders are not defending well, or that they are otherwise about to score, whereas missing a lottery ticket by only one digit has no bearing on the effectiveness of buying another lottery ticket.

According to a study published in Neuron, gamblers also have an inflated confidence when they choose their lottery ticket or throw the roulette ball by themselves, compared to when another person throws it. For example, craps players have been found to throw the dice harder for a higher roll, again mistaking chance for skill.

=== Effects outside of gambling ===
Besides gambling, the near-miss effect also affects decision making in other fields. For example, gamblers who experience the near-miss effect view it as a success, leading to riskier decision making. They also subjectively assess the future probability of failure to be lower than the actual probability. Managers who make decisions leading to the near-miss effect are evaluated as highly as managers who make decisions resulting in successes. Robin L. Dillon, Catherine H. Tinsley and Matthew Cronin, explaining the result, write: "People did not update given probabilities, they did not calculate new probabilities, they simply felt differently about the initial probabilities that were given. Thus it might be said that near-miss information changes people’s frames of reference."

== Documentation ==
Daniel Kahneman and Amos Tversky in 1982 considered a lottery where the winning ticket number is 865304 and there are three ticket holders, with numbers 361204, 965304 and 865305 respectively. They asserted that the first two ticket holders would not be troubled, whereas the third one would experience frustration due to the near-miss effect.

An experiment on rats used a machine similar to a slot machine to study the near-miss effect. The machine allowed rats to press a lever in which, if all three lights on display flashed, the rats would win a pellet of food; otherwise, the lever would inflict a time penalty. The experiment found that the rats were more likely to press the lever when they won or when two of the three lights flashed (a near-miss). Different studies have shown that about 30% of near-misses increased the rate of gambling behavior.

The near-miss effect is commonly seen in slot machines. For example, in a slot machine where "cherry, cherry, cherry" signals a win, "cherry, cherry, lemon" would be an example of a near-miss. This is shown by measures of direct frustration like how hard the spin button is pressed. Therefore, slot machines have a high rate of near-misses which may add to their addictive potential. The evidence for the emotional impact of near-misses is mixed; some studies show no significant results.

Wordle, a popular word guessing game, contains near-misses. Video games too can have similar characteristics.

=== Critical reviews ===
Some papers have not found evidence of the near miss effect. For example, a study published by Cambridge University Press found no evidence of the near-miss effect. Instead, the study found a negative correlation for 20 out of the 30 participants. Another study published in 1986 also found no evidence of the near miss effect.

== See also ==
- Psychology of reasoning
- Problem gambling
- Sport psychology
- Gambler's fallacy
