= Fan effect =

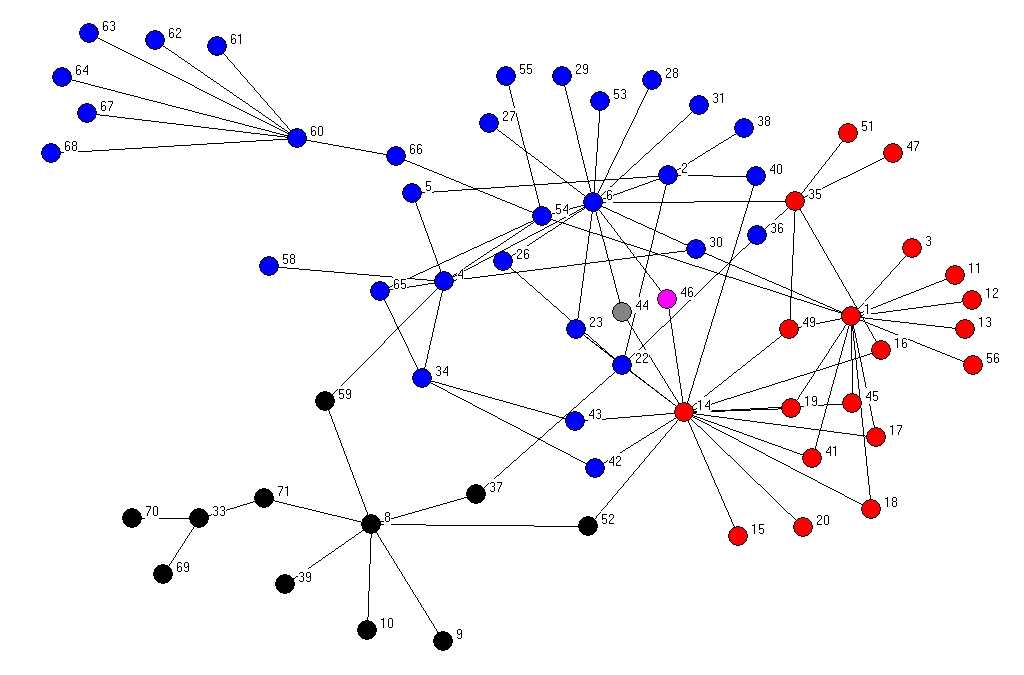
Idea Networking Example

The fan effect is a psychological phenomenon under the branch of cognitive psychology where recognition times or error rate for a particular concept increases as more information about the concept is acquired. The word "fan" refers to the number of associations correlated with the concept.

== The origin of the fan effect ==
The fan effect first appeared in a series of experiments conducted by John R. Anderson, a cognitive psychologist, in 1974. The three experiments he conducted involved participants learning 26 sentences that paired a person with a location. Additionally, they were asked to determine whether or not a particular sentence that was given to them belonged to the 26 they were asked to study. An example of a sentence Anderson used in his experiment was: "A hippie is in the park." Some sentences seemed similar in the sense that a person was paired with another location. For instance, "A hippie is in the church." Results revealed that participants produced a longer retrieval time when a person was paired with more than one location. Overall, these experiments demonstrated that multiple associations, such as including a large number of nouns in a sentence, interfered with the recognition time by producing a much slower effect. Association splitting, a self-help technique devised for individuals with obsessive-compulsive disorder (OCD), builds upon the fan-effect. In OCD, associations are typically constricted to OCD-related meanings (e.g., fire = danger, cancer = death). Patients are taught to contemplate alternative meanings to reduce the strength of fearful associations (e.g., fire = diamond, cancer = zodiac sign). According to a systematic review, the technique leads to a significant reduction of OCD symptoms relative to control conditions.

== Spreading activation ==
Memory stores information in a network of nodes that are linked together. When a memory is retrieved, activation spreads on the links until it intersects or enough time has passed. If there is one association, the activation only has to spread to a single link whereas multiple associations would divide the activation to many links. Because there are so many connections, longer time is required to identify the concepts and retrieve the memory.

== Plausible theories ==
The fan effect is due to multiple mental models and is included as part of the ACT-R theory. The key factors that the fan effect is dependent on are the strength and degree to which one of the variables can predict the other and the importance of the concept to a person during the retrieval process. Concepts can be better recognized by similar ideas instead of a random order of ideas. When stored in a random order, the concepts are placed in independent places in the brain instead of putting the concepts together as one unit. The fan effect can be reduced if random sentences are exposed frequently and unified into one concept. The time it takes to retrieve information using the fan effect increases with age because of age-related effects/interference with retrieval.
