= Perruchet effect =

The Perruchet effect is a psychological phenomenon in which a dissociation is shown between conscious expectation of an event and the strength or speed of a response to the event. This can be demonstrated by sequential analyses of consecutive trials such as eye blinking conditioning, electrodermal shocks and cued go/no-go task. The dissociation design differentiates the automatic associative strength and propositional expectation's effects on associative learning and conditioning, i.e., the cognitive learning process with relationship between events.

The effect is named after Pierre Perruchet, who first proposed a conditioning paradigm to take separate accounts of two mechanisms underlying associative learning processes:

1. The automatic formation of links between two events, whereas repeated pairing of the events should enhance the associative strength of conditioned response.
2. The propositional reasoning on the relationship between two events, in which inferences drawn from the sequential presentation of events would cast a conscious expectancy on the next event.

Thus, it contrasts traditional strength theory in associative learning and expectancy theory in propositional learning.

The Perruchet effect is considered a type of non-local influence on behavior. It goes against the view that conscious inferences about the relations between events are the offshoot of human conditioned responses, and challenges the single-processing model on propositional learning. To date, the Perruchet effect is one of the strongest pieces of evidence supporting dual-processing model of associative learning.

== Original study ==
In 1985, Perruchet conducted an eyeblink conditioning paradigm to evaluate the expectancy theory in human conditioning. A neutral conditioned stimulus (CS) - a musical tone was paired with an unconditioned stimulus – an air-puff of nitrogen gas (US) to participants’ eyes. Based on classical conditioning, after repeated trials with air-puffs of nitrogen gas right after the tone (CS-US pairs), participants are expected to acquire and exhibit conditioned responses - eye blinking when the tone was presented alone (CS-alone).

There were two types of trials: CS-alone and CS-US pairs. During the experiment, trial sequences were generated in randomised intermittent - in each trial, presentations of CS-alone and CS-US pairs had equal chances of 50%. The participants were fully informed of such randomisation. The strength of conditioned responses in different lengths of trial runs (i.e., sequences with same type of consecutive trials) was then recorded.

The results showed a double dissociation in associative learning: from runs of CS-alone events in decreasing lengths (4-1), to runs of CS-US pairs in increasing lengths (1-4), the frequency of conditioned responses increased in function of preceding trial runs, while the expectancy rating decreased in accordance with the gambler’s fallacy. Perruchet remarked that in the paradigm, conditioned responses were better predicted with associative strength, which presented itself in an increasing trend.

=== Variations ===
Research has shown that in electrodermal conditionings i.e., skin conductance paradigms, the conscious expectancy of stimuli is essential towards generating conditioned responses.

Reaction time paradigms were also developed to examine the Perruchet effect in other conditioning formats, e.g., in cued go/no-go and simple reaction time (RT) tasks. In general, the participants displayed a shortened performance time, yet decreased expectancy on the task appearance in the next trial, showcasing the same dissociation from conditioned responses.

== Theoretical basis ==
The Perruchet paradigm was designed with the foundation of two contrasting theories, strength theory and expectancy theory.

=== Strength theory ===
The strength theory is based on the traditional model of associative learning and concerns automatic link formations via event contingencies. For example, in classical conditioning, the theory suggests that repeated enhancement in association between CS and US (i.e., presentation of CS-US pairs) strengthens the unconsciously perceived link. With established literature on associative memory and classical conditioning, the strength or speed of a conditioned response should in turn increase with the strength of associative link.

=== Expectancy theory ===
Many literatures support the importance of conscious awareness in conditioning. In particular, the propositional model of associative learning suggests that the inference from CS to US brings a conscious expectancy of US based on CS. The propositional knowledge (inference) then generates conditioned response.

In Perruchet’s paradigm, the expectancy of participants can be manifested by the gambler’s fallacy - a false belief (or cognitive bias) that if an event has occurred less frequently than normal in the past, it becomes more likely to happen in the future. This is an incorrect perception as the likelihood of each event happening is always constant (if given), and the probabilities of events are independent from each other, i.e., the outcome of next event should have no relation with any previous event. Such a cognitive bias can be partially explained by representative heuristics, which suggest that our perceived likelihood of events is largely dependent on the representation of a small sample of previous events. This causes us to neglect information on any given objective probability, and subjectively misinterpret likelihood of future events based on recent sequences of events.

Under such belief, participants are predicted to have a higher expectancy for US occurrence with longer lengths of CS-alone runs, and lower expectancy for CS-US occurrence with longer lengths of CS-US pair runs. In other words, the subjective ratings of expectancy should decrease as a function of lengths from longest CS-alone runs to longest CS-US pair runs.

== Significance ==
=== Dual-processing theory ===
The dual-processing model of associative learning accounts for both primitive, implicit system of automatic link formations and conscious, effortful system of contingency inferences in associative learning.

The Perruchet effect supports the dual-processing theory with the dissociation of conscious expectancy from conditioned response, as occurrences of dissociation can be used to infer the existence of distinctive sets of cognitive mechanisms. Further, the account for expectancy via gambler’s fallacy remains as the “strongest available evidence” for the occurrence of conditioning without presence of awareness.

=== Single-processing theory (or propositional model of learning) ===
An alternative view is the single-processing model of learning, which proposes that associative learning only depends on the non-automatic, conscious processing system of propositional evaluations. For instance, conditioned responses are completely attributed to conscious expectancy of events.

Based on recent reviews, most of the existing research on associative learning support this model. The Perruchet effect is one of the notable exceptions that challenges its foundation, as the demonstrated dissociation suggests a separation in conditioning with conscious and unconscious accounts.

Thus, many have attempted to theorise alternative explanations for the Perruchet effect. Possible confounding factors such as potential non-associative influences and unconditioned stimuli sensitizations are identified. For instance, in the eye blinking conditioning, the generation of conditioned responses, blinking can be solely due to the recency of unconditioned stimuli, air-puff, still being in effect.
