= Reproductive value (social psychology) =

Reproductive value is a term used by some social psychologists to describe reproductive capacity and potential reproductive success of female humans. The term can also describe the characteristics that people evaluate, consciously or unconsciously, when choosing female partners.

== See also ==
- Hypergamy
