= Robert Hanna =

Robert Hanna may refer to:

- Robert Hanna (philosopher)
- Robert Hanna Jr., politician
- Robert Hill Hanna, soldier
