= CBDR =

CBDR may refer to:

- Common But Differentiated Responsibilities, a principle formalized in the UN Framework Convention on Climate Change (UNFCCC) of Earth Summit in Rio de Janeiro, 1992
- Constant bearing, decreasing range, a term in navigation
