= Dilution effect =

Dilution effect could refer to:

- Herd#Dilution effect, a survival strategy used by herds
- Heuristic (psychology)#Dilution effect, a psychological effect where irrelevant information weakens the effect of a stereotype
- Lethal injection#Dilution effect, an argument for opposing lethal injections
- Lyme disease#The dilution effect, a hypothesis that predicts that an increase in host biodiversity will result in a decrease in the number of vectors infected with a baterial species
