= Effort heuristic =

Tendency to judge objects that took a longer time to produce to be of higher value

The effort heuristic is a mental rule of thumb in which the quality or worth of an object is determined by the perceived amount of effort that went into its production. In brief, the effort heuristic in judgment and decision making follows a tendency to judge objects that took a longer time to produce to be of higher value. The more effort invested in an object, the better the quality it is deemed to be. This is especially true in situations where value is difficult to assess or the evaluator lacks expertise in the appraisal of an item. People regard effort as a generally reliable indicator of quality. When purchasing a carpet, for example, the seller of a Persian carpet will highlight the number of months or years that it took to produce the piece, and the more intricate the design—signifying grater effort—the greater the value as compared with a mass-produced carpet.

An example of this would be the comparison of $100 earned, and $100 found. If someone finds $100 they are more inclined to go spend it on a whim, but if that $100 is part of a hard-earned paycheck, they are less likely to squander it away. Another way that the effort heuristic can be considered is the amount of effort a person will put into an action depending on the goal. If the goal is of little importance, the amount of effort a person is willing to put into it is going to be lower.

== The Kruger study ==
There is experimental evidence that supports the notion that people sometimes use the effort that has been put into doing something as an estimate for its quality. The seminal study that investigated this phenomenon was done by Kruger, Wirtz, Van Boven, and Altermatt (2004). They conducted three experiments in which participants made judgments of quality—a poem in Experiment 1, paintings in Experiment 2, and medieval arms and armor in Experiment 3. In each experiment, they manipulated the effort seemingly invested in the objects' creation. Despite the fact that the actual quality of the work remained the same, they anticipated that manipulations in supposed effort would influence perceived quality.

=== Experiment 1 ===
In the first experiment, participants evaluated a poem with respect to how much they enjoyed it, the overall quality of the poem, and the amount of money a poetry magazine would pay for the poem. They were told that the experiment concerned the way in which people evaluate poetry. The subjects were randomly assigned to one of two condition groups in this study: low effort and high effort. Participants in the low-effort condition were told that the writer spent 4 hours on the poem while participants in the high-effort condition were told the poet spent 18 hours on the piece. The researchers combined the liking and quality measures into one composite result and found participants provided more favorable evaluations of the poem when they thought it took the poet 18 hours to compose rather than when they thought it took him 4 hours. They also judged the more effortful poem to be worth more money.

=== Experiment 2 ===
In the second experiment, non-experts and self-identified experts individually evaluated the quality of two paintings by Deborah Kleven: 12 Lines and Big Abstract. Half of the participants were told that the former took 4 hours to paint and the latter 26 hours, and the other half were told the opposite. After rating each painting separately, participants then compared the two paintings directly.

The results revealed that participants preferred 12 Lines over Big Abstract when they thought 12 Lines took longer to paint, but the opposite tended to be true when they thought that Big Abstract took longer to paint. The effort manipulation had a similar effect on participants' estimates of how much the paintings were worth. Participants who thought 12 Lines took longer to produce thought that it was worth more money than Big Abstract, whereas the opposite tended to be true when participants thought that Big Abstract took longer to paint. The data also indicated that the effect of perceived effort on perceived quality was independent of whether participants had self-professed expertise in the domain. Self-identified art experts did not appear to rely on effort any less than novices, despite the fact that the self-identified experts were presumably more practiced at evaluating art. This points to the generality and intuitive appeal of effort as a heuristic for quality.

=== Experiment 3 ===
In the third and final experiment, researchers asked participants to rate the quality of several images of medieval arms and armor presented on a computer screen. When rating the final target piece of armor, half of the participants were told that it took the blacksmith 110 hours to complete, and half were told that it took 15 hours. In addition to manipulating the perceived effort invested by the artist, researchers also varied the ambiguity of the stimulus to examine its potential as a moderator in the use of the effort heuristic. This was done by altering the resolution of the image where half of the participants viewed a high-resolution image of the piece, and half viewed a low-resolution image.

Experiment 3 produced similar results to the first two; participants provided higher ratings of the piece when they thought it took the blacksmith longer to produce. The more effort invested in the object, the better it was assumed to be. The influence of effort on judgment was also greater in the high-ambiguity condition than in the low-ambiguity condition. This was expected because the quality of the armor was more ambiguous in the low-resolution condition. Participants in this condition had less objective information upon which to make a judgment of quality, and thus were more likely to rely on the perceived effort invested by the blacksmith while evaluating.

== Explanations ==
Human behavior, like that of most other animals, is often driven by rewards and directed by the energetic cost of an action. It takes effort to attain rewards, and people accordingly weigh the value of rewards against the amount of effort that is required to attain them. At an early age, children learn that good performance due to high effort is valued by adults and that teachers are most likely to reward those who work hard. With experience, they internalize effort as a valuable commodity.

== Alternative theories ==
Research directly examining and testing the effort heuristic is scarce; however, there are other research areas that incorporated this construct and, in some way, manipulated its effects. However, a key distinction between the study done by Kruger et al. and other research on the role of effort on judgment is that the former focused on other-generated effort rather than self-generated effort.

=== Cognitive dissonance ===
==== Effort justification ====
Over half a century ago, social psychologist Leon Festinger developed the theory of cognitive dissonance. It asserts that inconsistencies among a person's beliefs, attitudes, or opinions produce psychological discomfort, leading people to rationalize their behavior or change their attitudes. One concept that stemmed from the dissonance theory is that of effort justification in which the subjective value of an outcome is directly related to the effort that went into obtaining it. When people suffer, work hard, or make sacrifices, they will attempt to convince themselves that it is worthwhile. People tend to put the most value on goals or items that have required considerable effort to achieve. This is probably because cognitive dissonance would arise if great effort is made to achieve something that is subsequently evaluated negatively.

==== Aronson and Mills (1959) ====
Aronson and Mills conducted a study in which college students underwent a "severe" or a "mild" initiation to join a discussion group. Subjects in the severe initiation group were required to read a sexually explicit passage out loud in front of the experimenter, whereas those in the mild initiation group read a less embarrassing passage. When subjects were asked to evaluate the discussion group, those in the severe initiation condition rated it higher than those in the mild initiation group. Aronson and Mills interpreted their result in terms of cognitive dissonance. According to Aronson and Mills, to resolve the dissonance produced by reading the embarrassing passage, subjects in the severe initiation group gave more value to the discussion group than did subjects in the mild initiation group. The more difficult the task, the greater the value given to sources of reinforcement that followed task completion.

=== Self-perception theory ===
Daryl Bem (1965) proposed an alternative to the cognitive dissonance theory in explaining how attitudes are shaped. The self-perception theory suggests that people infer their own attitudes, opinions, and other internal states partly by observing their behavior and the circumstances in which that behavior occurs. This pattern of thought unfolds because people are engaged in normal efforts to better understand their own behaviors. Bem suggested that all individuals analyze their own behavior as much as an outside observer might and, as a result of these observations, people make judgments about why they are motivated to do what they do. He originally believed that most findings explained by cognitive dissonance were really due to self-perception. However, studies have shown that self-perception is primarily at work when subjects do not have well-defined attitudes regarding the issue at hand.

== Applications ==
=== Goal evaluations ===
Research has shown that the amount of energy put towards the achievement of a goal may play a role in the development or change of an individual's attitude towards that goal. While evaluating a goal, one is motivated to place more value on a goal that has required greater effort to achieve. Axsom and Cooper (1985) suggested that if an objective or the way in which a goal is obtained is not initially attractive, an individual may later look to their own past behavior to determine their attitude towards that goal. If much effort has been spent in the attainment of a goal, it should come to be seen as worthwhile and therefore more attractive. This resembles the need to justify one's efforts in accordance with the cognitive dissonance theory, but there is evidence supporting that other factors may be at play.

One study proposed that the experienced goal value and consumers' subsequent motivation vary as a function of whether or not the pursuit of the goal is perceived to be one's autonomous choice. They found that when consumers perceive that the goal they pursue is adopted through an autonomous choice, the initial effort investment is experienced as reflecting the value of the goal; therefore, greater effort increased the value of the goal as well as consumers' subsequent motivation. Conversely, if consumers perceive that the goal has been imposed on them, they experience psychological reactance that is proportional to the amount of effort that they expend in pursuing the goal; thus, they devalue the goal as they invest more effort in its pursuit and show lower subsequent motivation.

=== Consumer appraisal ===
The study by Kruger et al. demonstrated that when evaluating an item, people have a tendency to judge objects that took a longer time to produce to be of higher value. With this knowledge, companies can manipulate the manner in which a product is viewed to make their products appear desirable to consumers. Because effort is usually required to get the best outcomes, people looking for the best outcomes presume effort must imply the best possible outcome. Briñol, Petty, and Tormala (2006) suggested that the impact of effort on evaluation depends on the meaning people are overtly directed to assign to effort. For example, if people are told that unintelligent people like ease, outcomes associated with ease are judged less favorably.

== See also ==
- Availability heuristic
- Affect heuristic
- Labor theory of value
