= Ameriks =

Ameriks is a surname. Notable people with the surname include:

- Andris Ameriks (born 1961), Latvian politician and economist
- Karl Ameriks (1947–2025), American philosopher
