= Omri Boehm =

Israeli author and philosopher

- עמרי בהם
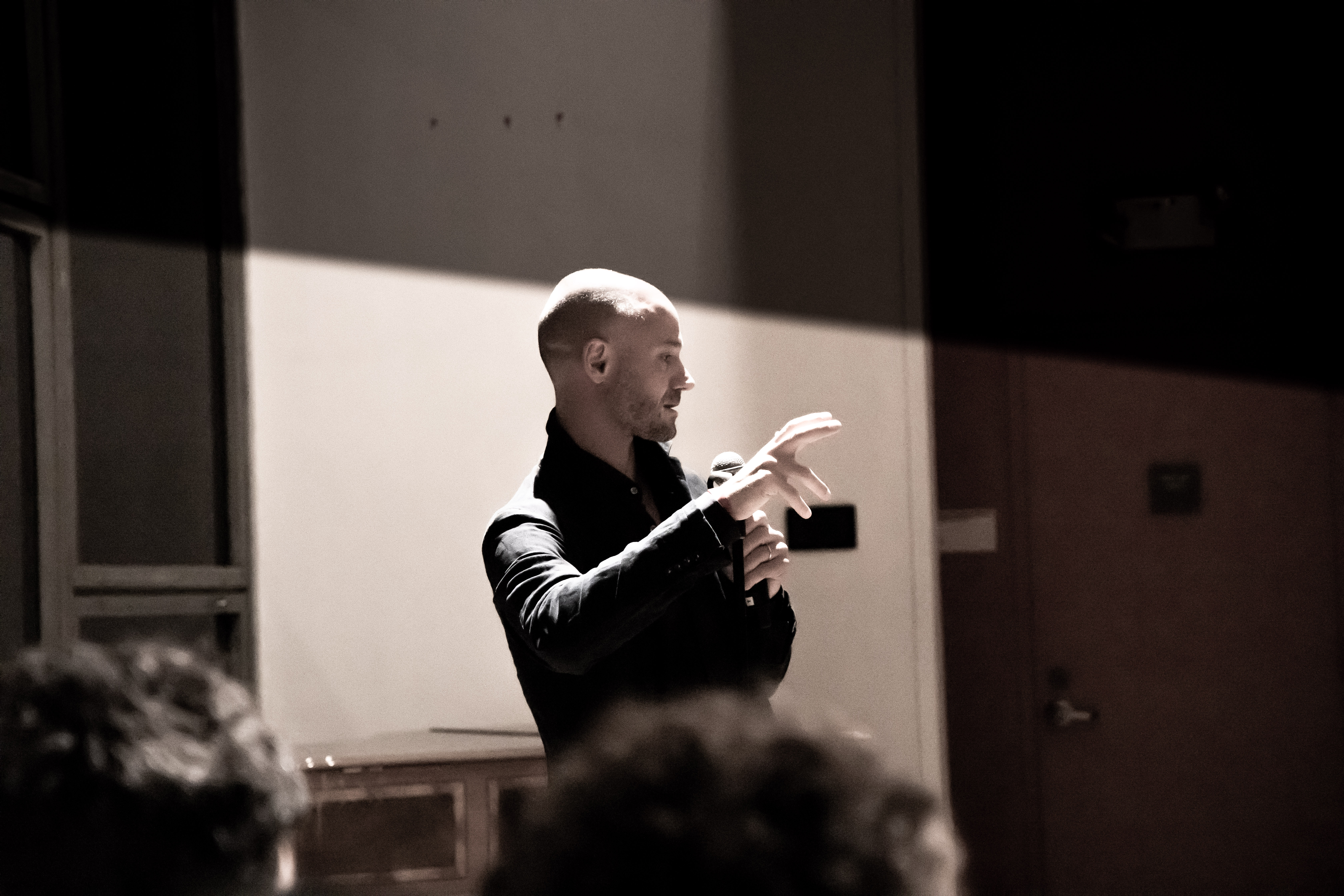
- Born: 1979 (age 46–47); Gilon, Israel

Education
- Education: Tel Aviv University (BA); Yale University (PhD)
- Thesis: Kant's Critique of Spinoza (2009)
- Doctoral advisor: Michael Della Rocca; Karsten Harries

Philosophical work
- Era: Contemporary philosophy
- Region: Western philosophy
- School: Kantianism
- Institutions: New School for Social Research
- Main interests: Political philosophy, ethics, philosophy of religion, early modern philosophy
- Notable ideas: Radical universalism

Omri Boehm (Hebrew: עמרי בהם; born 1979) is an Israeli philosopher and associate professor of philosophy at the New School for Social Research. He is known for his interpretation of the Binding of Isaac (Genesis 22), work on Kant, and writing on Israel and Zionism.

== Life and career ==
Boehm grew up in the Galilee. He studied at the Adi Lautman Interdisciplinary Programme for Outstanding Students at Tel Aviv University and earned his PhD at Yale University. He did a post-doc at LMU Munich in 2010. He is an associate professor of philosophy at the New School for Social Research based in New York City.

Boehm's first book, The Binding of Isaac: a Religious Model of Disobedience, argues (contending that the verse in which God tells Abraham not to kill Isaac is a later addition) that Abraham disobeyed God's command to sacrifice his son Isaac, and disobedience rather than obedience is the corner of Jewish faith. His second book, Kant's Critique of Spinoza, argues that the Critique of Pure Reason needs to be read as an answer to Spinoza's Ethics. His next book, Haifa Republic: A Democratic Future for Israel, develops a model for bi-national Zionism. His writings have appeared in The New York Times, The Washington Post, Haaretz, and Die Zeit, among others.

In 2024, Boehm received the Leipzig Book Award for European Understanding for his publication Radical Universalism.

A planned speech by Boehm on April 6, 2025, at an event commemorating the liberation of the Buchenwald concentration camp was postponed after the Israeli embassy in Germany put pressure on the promoters. The head of the Buchenwald memorial, Jens-Christian Wagner, said that he and Boehm agreed to postpone the speech in favor of the Holocaust survivors present that day and not because of pressure placed on him or the memorial. But on public radio Wagner said that it had felt very bad "to actually be pressured into denying a Holocaust survivor’s grandson the floor". The Israeli embassy wrote on social media that Boehm would dilute the memory of the Holocaust and that he had compared the Holocaust to the Nakba. In an interview with Austrian public broadcaster ORF five months earlier, Boehm had called such allegations "fake facts". Boehm’s speech was subsequently published in the Süddeutsche Zeitung and in English in Haaretz. In its first press statement on April 1, the Buchenwald memorial's organization clarified that Boehm "is an important international bridge builder" and that the postponement had been necessary to avoid disturbing the commemoration with a "debate from outside".

== Books ==
- The Binding of Isaac: a Religious Model of Disobedience. Continuum, 2007; paperback, Bloomsbury, 2014.
- Kant's Critique of Spinoza. Oxford University Press, 2014.
- Haifa Republic: A Democratic Future for Israel. New York Review Books, 2021.
- Radikaler Universalismus: Jenseits von Identität. Berlin: Propyläen, 2023. English edition: Radical Universalism.
- Der bestirnte Himmel über mir: Ein Gespräch über Kant (A Conversation about Kant, with Daniel Kehlmann). Berlin: Propyläen, 2024.
- Die Realität der Ideale. Berlin: Propyläen, 2024. English edition: The Reality of Ideals.
