= Simulation heuristic =

Mental strategy

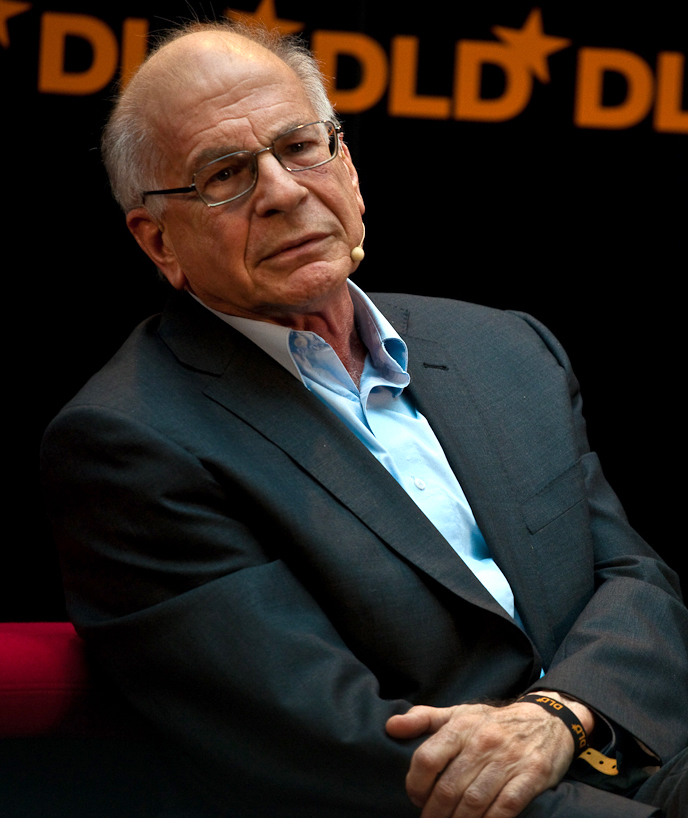
Daniel Kahneman

The simulation heuristic is a psychological heuristic, or simplified mental strategy, according to which people determine the likelihood of an event based on how easy it is to picture the event mentally. Partially as a result, people experience more regret over outcomes that are easier to imagine, such as "near misses". The simulation heuristic was first theorized by psychologists Daniel Kahneman and Amos Tversky as a specialized adaptation of the availability heuristic to explain counterfactual thinking and regret. However, it is not the same as the availability heuristic. Specifically the simulation heuristic is defined as "how perceivers tend to substitute normal antecedent events for exceptional ones in psychologically 'undoing' this specific outcome."

Kahneman and Tversky also believed that people used this heuristic to understand and predict other's behavior in certain circumstances and to answer questions involving counterfactual propositions. People, they believe, do this by mentally undoing events that have occurred and then running mental simulations of the events with the corresponding input values of the altered model. For example, a study was proposed that provided a group of participants with a situation describing two men who were delayed by half an hour in a traffic jam on the way to the airport. Both men were delayed enough that they both missed flights on which they were booked, one of them by half an hour and the second by only five minutes (because his flight had been delayed for 25 minutes). The results showed that a greater number of participants thought that the second man would be more upset than the first man.

Kahneman and Tversky argued that this difference could not be attributed to disappointment, because both had expected to miss their flights. They believed instead that the true explanation was that the students utilized the simulation heuristic and so it was easier for them to imagine minor alterations that would have enabled the second man to arrive in time for his flight than it was for them to devise the same alterations for the first man.

== History ==
This heuristic was introduced by the Israeli psychologists Daniel Kahneman (1934–2024) and Amos Tversky (1937–1996) in a lecture in 1979. It was published as a book chapter in 1982.

== Difference from the availability heuristic ==
The subjective probability judgments of an event used in the simulation heuristic do not follow the availability heuristic, in that these judgments are not the cause of relevant examples in memory but are instead based on the ease with which situations that did not happen can be mentally simulated or imagined.

== Application ==
The theory that underlies the simulation heuristic assumes that one's judgments are biased towards information that is easily imagined or simulated mentally. It is because of this that we see biases having to do with the overestimation of how causally plausible an event could be or the enhanced regret experienced when it is easy to mentally undo an unfortunate event, such as an accident. Significant research on simulation heuristic's application in counterfactual reasoning has been performed by Dale Miller and Bryan Taylor.

For example, they found that if an affectively negative experience, such as a fatal car accident was brought about by an extraordinary event, such as someone who usually goes by train to work but instead drove, the simulation heuristic will cause an emotional reaction of regret. This emotional reaction is because the exceptional event is easy to mentally undo and replace with a more common one that would not have caused the accident.

Kahneman and Tversky did a study in which two individuals were given lottery tickets and then were given the opportunity to sell those same tickets back either two weeks before the drawing or an hour before the drawing. They proposed this question to some participants whose responses showed that they believed that the man who had sold his ticket an hour before the drawing would experience the greatest anticipatory regret when that ticket won.

Kahneman and Tversky explained these findings through the understanding of the norm theory, by stating that "people's anticipatory regret, along with reluctance to sell the ticket, should increase with their ease of imagining themselves still owning the winning ticket". Therefore, the man who recently sold his ticket will experience more regret because the "counterfactual world", in which he is the winner, is perceived as closer for him than the man who sold his ticket two weeks ago. This example shows the bias in this type of thinking because both men had the same probability of winning if they had not sold their tickets and the time differences in which they did will not increase or decrease these chances.

Similar results were found with plane crash survivors. These individuals experienced a greater amount of anticipatory regret when they engaged in the highly mutable action of switching flights last minute. It was reasoned that this was due to a person "anticipating counterfactual thoughts that a negative event was evoked, because it tends to make the event more vivid, and so tends to make it more subjectively likely".

== Applications ==
This heuristic has shown to be a salient feature of clinical anxiety and its disorders, which are marked by heightened expectations of future negative events. A study done by David Raune and Andrew Macleod tried to tie the cognitive mechanisms that underlie this type of judgment to the simulation heuristic.

Their findings showed that anxious patients' simulation heuristic scores were correlated with the subjective probability, such that the more reasons anxious patients could think of why negative events would happen, relative to the number why they would not happen, the higher their subjective probability judgment that the events would happen to them. Further it was found that anxious patients displayed increased access to the simulation compared to control patients.

They also found support for the hypothesis that the easier it was for anxious patients to form the visual image, the greater the subjective probability that the event would happen to them. Through this work they purposed that the main clinical implication of the simulation heuristic results is that, in order to lower elevated subjective probability in clinical anxiety, patients should be encouraged to think of more reasons why the negative events will not occur then why they will occur.

== How it is affected by other heuristics ==
A study done by Philip Broemer was done to test the hypothesis that the subjective ease with which one can imagine a symptom will be affected by the impact of differently framed messages on attitudes toward performing health behaviors.

By drawing on the simulation heuristic, he argued that the vividness of information is reflected in the subjective ease with which people can imagine having symptoms of an illness.

His results showed that the impact of message framing upon attitudes was moderated by the ease of imagination and clearly supported the congruency hypothesis for different kinds of health behavior. Finding that, negatively framed messages led to more positive attitudes when the recipients of these messages could easily imagine the relevant symptoms. Ease of imagination thus facilitates persuasion when messages emphasize potential health risks. A positive framing however, leads to more positive attitudes when symptom imagination was rather difficult.

Therefore, a message with a reassuring theme is more congruent with a recipient's state of mind when he or she cannot easily imagine the symptoms whereas a message with an aversive theme is more congruent with a recipient's state of mind when he or she can easily imagine having the symptoms.

== See also ==
- Algorithm
- Behavioral economics – an economic subfield which looks at heuristics in decision making
- List of biases in judgment and decision making
- Problem solving
- Representativeness heuristic
