= Karsten Harries =

German philosopher

- Born: 1937 (age 88–89); Jena, Germany
- Awards: Guggenheim Fellowship

Education
- Education: Yale University (Ph.D., 1962)
- Thesis: In a Strange Land: An Exploration of Nihilism (1962)
- Doctoral advisor: George A. Schrader

Philosophical work
- Era: Contemporary philosophy
- Region: Western philosophy
- School: Continental philosophy
- Institutions: Yale University
- Doctoral students: Karl Ameriks, Omri Boehm, Robert Gooding-Williams, Robert Hanna, Kathleen Higgins, David Kolb
- Notable students: Daniel Breazeale
- Main interests: Philosophy of art, ethics

Karsten Harries (born 1937) is a German philosopher and Emeritus Howard H. Newman Professor of Philosophy at Yale University, where he taught from 1965 until his retirement. Harries is known for his expertise on Heidegger, early modern philosophy, and the philosophy of art and architecture.

== Books ==
- Wahrheit: Die Architektur der Welt (Broschiert, 2012)
- Art Matters: A Critical Commentary on Heidegger's "The Origin of the Work of Art" (Springer, 2009)
- Die bayerische Rokokokirche: Das Irrationale und das Sakrale (2009); reworked version of The Bavarian Rococo Church
- Between Nihilism and Faith: A Commentary on Either/Or (De Gruyter, 2010)
- Infinity and Perspective (Cambridge, Mass.: MIT, 2001)
- The Ethical Function of Architecture (Cambridge, Mass.: MIT, 1997), winner of the American Institute of Architects 8th Annual International Architecture Book Award for Criticism.
- Martin Heidegger: Kunst, Politik, Technik (edited, with Christoph Jamme, 1992), appeared in English as Martin Heidegger: Politics, Art, and Technology (Teaneck: Holmes & Meier, 1994)
- The Broken Frame: Three Lectures (Washington, D.C.: CUA Press, 1990)
- The Bavarian Rococo Church: Between Faith and Aestheticism (New Haven: Yale, 1983)
- The Meaning of Modern Art (Evanston: Northwestern, 1968)
