= Shlomo Benartzi =

American behavioral economist

Shlomo Benartzi (Hebrew: שלמה בן ארצי) is an American behavioral economist, known for his research on retirement savings and the Save More Tomorrow nudge. Benartzi is a Professor Emeritus at the UCLA Anderson School of Management in Los Angeles, California.

== Academic career ==
Benartzi received a bachelor's degree from Tel Aviv University and a Ph.D. from Cornell University's Johnson Graduate School of Management. Along with Nobel Laureate Richard Thaler of the University of Chicago, he developed the Save More Tomorrow program (SMarT) which helps employees improve their savings rates over time. The SMarT program is now implemented by the majority of large retirement plans in the United States. Key elements of Save More Tomorrow have also been included in the Pension Protection Act of 2006.

In addition, Benartzi has collaborated on research examining the financial decision-making of individual investors, such as his work on myopic loss aversion and naïve diversification.

Benartzi's current focus is online behavior, studying the ways in which people behave differently in the digital world. The end goal is to use this knowledge to design more effective digital interfaces.

In 2018, Benartzi was named Distinguished Senior Fellow at the University of Pennsylvania's Behavior Change for Good Initiative.

== Writing ==
Benartzi is the author of three books. His first book was Save More Tomorrow—it focused on improving retirement outcomes by using behavioral insights. His second book, Thinking Smarter, outlined a new approach to reflecting on major life decisions and setting life goals. His most recent book is The Smarter Screen, which outlines the latest research on digital nudging and online behavioral interventions.

In addition, Benartzi is a frequent contributor to the Wealth section of The Wall Street Journal, where he writes on the subjects of behavioral finance and personalized finance.

== Business activities ==
Benartzi has been Chief Behavioral Economist for the Allianz Global Investors Center for Behavioral Finance. He is currently Senior Academic Advisor for the Voya Behavioral Finance Institute for Innovation. In addition, Benartzi has been on advisory boards for Acorns, WisdomTree, idomoo, Morningstar and Personal Capital. He is also the founder of Digitai, a consulting firm that designs digital interventions that benefit consumers, businesses and society. He is also an advisor to Ant Transaction Machines, Inc. ATM.com hosts info concerning this Acorns-flavored idea.

== Government activities ==
Benartzi has advised government agencies in the U.S. and abroad while helping to craft numerous legislative efforts. Benartzi is Chief Scientist for the California Digital Nudge Initiative helping the state develop digital interventions to address societal challenges.
