= Logic and rationality =

Fundamental concepts in philosophy

As the study of argument is of clear importance to the reasons that we hold things to be true, logic is of essential importance to rationality. Arguments may be logical if they are "conducted or assessed according to strict principles of validity", while they are rational according to the broader requirement that they are based on reason and knowledge.

Logic and rationality have each been taken as fundamental concepts in philosophy. They are not the same thing. Philosophical rationalism in its most extreme form is the doctrine that knowledge can ultimately be founded on pure reason, while logicism is the doctrine that mathematical concepts, among others, are reducible to pure logic.

== Forms of reasoning ==
Argument terminology used in logic

Deductive reasoning concerns the logical consequence of given premises. On a narrow conception of logic, logic concerns just deductive reasoning, although such a narrow conception controversially excludes most of what is called informal logic from the discipline. Other forms of reasoning are sometimes also taken to be part of logic, such as inductive reasoning and abductive reasoning, which are forms of reasoning that are not purely deductive, but include material inference. Similarly, it is important to distinguish deductive validity and inductive validity (called "strength"). An inference is deductively valid if and only if there is no possible situation in which all the premises are true but the conclusion false. An inference is inductively strong if and only if its premises give some degree of probability to its conclusion.

The notion of deductive validity can be rigorously stated for systems of formal logic in terms of the well-understood notions of semantics. Inductive validity, on the other hand, requires us to define a reliable generalization of some set of observations. The task of providing this definition may be approached in various ways, some less formal than others; some of these definitions may use logical association rule induction, while others may use mathematical models of probability such as decision trees. For the most part this discussion of logic deals only with deductive logic.

Abductive reasoning is a form of inference which goes from an observation to a theory which accounts for the observation, ideally seeking to find the simplest and most likely explanation. In abductive reasoning, unlike in deductive reasoning, the premises do not guarantee the conclusion. One can understand abductive reasoning as "inference to the best explanation".

== Critical thinking ==
Critical thinking, also called critical analysis, is clear, rational thinking involving critique.

== Dialectic ==
Dialectic is a discourse between two or more people holding different points of view about a subject but wishing to establish the truth through reasoned arguments. It has been the object of study since ancient times, but only recently has it been the subject of attempts at formalisation.

== Illogical thinking and irrational processes ==
Illogicality in terms of thinking processes are, as defined by researchers such as Aaron T. Beck, cognitive distortions that cause abnormal functioning. The state of depression often feeds off of illogical thinking and results in victims being mired in self-defeating conclusions. Patients seeking psychological help may suffer from problems of overgeneralization, becoming mired in general, negative conclusions on the basis of essentially insignificant life events. Cognitive behavioral therapy can assist individuals in recognizing their own habits of faulty logic and slanted interpretations of past experiences.

On the other hand, depression in the sense of "Weltschmerz" in its non-aesthetically realistic and non-positivistic nature is intrinsically logical and rational. Some philosophers assert that the question of value of life has not been answered in psychologically pleasing way without embracing circular reasoning fallacy.

In the socio-political context, the ability to amalgamate disparate, conflicting interests and passions into an illogical synthesis has been labeled as a possible strength, albeit one with concurrent weaknesses, by literary publications such as Blackwood's Magazine:

It is difficult not to connect together these two very characteristic ideas of illogicalness and permanence. Not that illogicalness is itself a virtue, but the illogicalness of which we speak is not simply bad reasoning. It means here only that more than one principle is found to assert itself in... social work. But these principles are fused into a higher unity. The illogicalness is not the cause of the permanence, but rather both are joint products of a common cause—respect, namely, for the living forces which exist in human nature.

== See also ==
- Alogia
- Dysrationalia

== Bibliography ==
- Robert Hanna, 2009. Rationality and Logic. MIT Press.
