= Michael Della Rocca =

American philosopher

- Born: Michael Angelo Della Rocca
- Spouse: Christine Hayes
- Awards: Sarai Ribicoff Award for Teaching Excellence (1998); Graduate Mentor Award (2006)

Education
- Education: Harvard University (BA); University of California, Berkeley (PhD)
- Thesis: Representation and the Mind-Body Problem in Spinoza (1991)
- Doctoral advisor: Wallace Matson

Philosophical work
- Era: Contemporary philosophy
- Region: Western philosophy
- School: Analytic philosophy
- Institutions: Yale University
- Doctoral students: Omri Boehm; Yitzhak Melamed
- Main interests: Metaphysics, epistemology, philosophy of mind, philosophy of action
- Notable ideas: Emphasis on the centrality of the Principle of Sufficient Reason in Spinoza's philosophy

Michael Angelo Della Rocca is Sterling Professor of Philosophy at Yale University and a specialist in early modern philosophy, especially Spinoza, and in metaphysics.

== Education and career ==
Della Rocca earned his B.A. at Harvard University and his Ph.D. at the University of California, Berkeley under the supervision of Wallace Matson. He joined the Yale faculty in 1991, and was promoted to Sterling Professor in 2021. Among his doctoral students is Yitzhak Melamed.

From 2001 to 2010, Della Rocca served as the chair of Yale's Department of Philosophy, where he played a crucial role in transforming the department from a state of "disarray" to one of the leading philosophy programs in the United States. During his tenure, he focused on strategic faculty appointments and fostering interdisciplinary collaboration, significantly improving the department's national and international reputation. He is also known for his mentorship of graduate students, encouraging them to develop their own philosophical views and engage critically with his work.

== Philosophical work ==
Della Rocca's interpretation of Spinoza emphasizes the centrality of the Principle of Sufficient Reason (PSR) to Spinoza's philosophy, proposing that the world is thoroughly intelligible and that there are no brute facts lacking explanation. His work on Spinoza has shaped contemporary understanding of early modern philosophy and has opened new directions for research into 17th-century rationalism. His recent book, The Parmenidean Ascent (2020), further explores themes of rationalism and monism, linking them from ancient Greek philosophy to modern debates. The book has been described as a significant challenge to the conventional boundaries of philosophical discourse.

Della Rocca's philosophical inquiries often intersect with contemporary scientific developments, examining how advances in fields like physics might resonate with rationalist and monistic perspectives. He has discussed how concepts such as quantum entanglement challenge traditional notions of space and distance, reflecting a philosophical alignment with Spinoza's ideas.

== Publications ==
=== Books ===
- Representation and the Mind-Body Problem in Spinoza (Oxford University Press, 1996)
- Spinoza (Routledge, 2008)
- The Parmenidean Ascent (Oxford University Press, 2020)

== Professional and editorial roles ==
Della Rocca serves as co-editor of Seventeenth-Century Philosophy for the Stanford Encyclopedia of Philosophy and is a member of several editorial boards, including the Journal of the History of Philosophy and History of Philosophy Quarterly. He has given numerous invited lectures worldwide, including the Whitehead Lectures at Harvard University and named lectures at the University of Leiden and Skidmore College.
