= Brian E. O'Neil =

American philosopher

- Born: 1921
- Died: 1985 (aged 63–64)

Education
- Education: University of California, Berkeley (BA, PhD)
- Thesis: Epistemological Direct Realism in Descartes' Philosophy (1968)
- Doctoral advisor: Wallace Matson

Philosophical work
- Era: Contemporary philosophy
- Region: Western philosophy
- School: Analytic philosophy
- Institutions: University of New Mexico
- Main interests: Early modern philosophy, epistemology, philosophy of perception

Brian E. O'Neil (1921–1985) was an American philosopher and a professor of philosophy at the University of New Mexico. He was known for his research on Descartes's philosophy. O'Neil died from cancer in 1985.

== Books ==
- Epistemological Direct Realism in Descartes' Philosophy, University of New Mexico Press (1974)
