= Naive diversification =

Naïve diversification is a choice heuristic (also known as "diversification heuristic"). Essentially, when asked to make several choices at once, people tend to diversify more than when making the same type of decision sequentially. Its first demonstration was made by Itamar Simonson in marketing in the context of consumption decisions by individuals. It was subsequently shown in the context of economic and financial decisions.

Simonson showed that when people have to make simultaneous choices (e.g. choose now which of six snacks to consume in the next three weeks), they tend to seek more variety (e.g., pick more kinds of snacks) than when they make sequential choices (e.g., choose once a week which of six snacks to consume that week for three weeks). Subsequent research replicated the effect using a field experiment: on Halloween night, young trick-or-treaters were required to make a simultaneous or subsequent choice between the candies they received. The results showed a strong diversification bias when choices had to be made simultaneously, but not when they were made sequentially.

Shlomo Benartzi and Richard Thaler commented on Read and Loewenstein's research: "This result is striking since in either case the candies are dumped into a bag and consumed later. It is the portfolio in the bag that matters, not the portfolio selected at each house." Following on the naive diversification showed by children, Benartzi and Thaler turned to study whether the effect manifests itself among investors making decisions in the context of defined contribution saving plans. They found that "some investors follow the '1/n strategy': they divide their contributions evenly across the funds offered in the plan. Consistent with this Naïve notion of diversification, we find that the proportion invested in stocks depends strongly on the proportion of stock funds in the plan." This finding is particularly troubling in the context of laypersons making financial decisions, because they may be diversifying in a way that is suboptimal; see efficient frontier.

Doron Kliger, Martijn van den Assem and Remco Zwinkels show that naïve reliance on the diversification rule is not limited to lay people and laboratory subjects. They distributed a questionnaire among behavioral finance researchers who had submitted a paper or had been asked to review a paper for a special issue of the Journal of Economic Behavior and Organization. Such experts are supposedly well-informed about the roles of heuristics and biases in judgment and decision-making. The questions related to the relative importance of different types of research in their field. Half of the potential respondents received the version where each question listed two or three possible types. The other half received exactly the same questions, but in their version one of the two or three types was further partitioned into finer components. The results show that these experts heavily relied on the diversification heuristic when they expressed their views about the future of their profession.

Daniel Fernandes of the Catholic University of Portugal used a similar procedure to Benartzi and Thaler's experiment to elicit the naïve diversification bias of each individual subject. Respondents were asked to make two hypothetical decisions. In the first decision, respondents had to allocate their savings to five funds, of which four were stock funds. In the second decision, respondents had to allocate their savings to five funds, of which four were fixed-income funds. The results replicate the original finding that respondents were way more likely to invest in stocks when the proportion of stock funds was larger. The naïve diversification bias was observed across many samples (even among professors of finance at the university) and was explained by the extent to which investors use their intuition to decide. The more investors use intuitive judgments, the more they display the naïve diversification bias.
