= Similarity heuristic =

The similarity heuristic is a psychological heuristic pertaining to how people make judgments based on similarity. More specifically, the similarity heuristic is used to account for how people make judgments based on the similarity between current situations and other situations or prototypes of those situations.

At its most basic level, the similarity heuristic is an adaptive strategy. The goal of the similarity heuristic is maximizing productivity through favorable experience while not repeating unfavorable experiences. Decisions based on how favorable or unfavorable the present seems are based on how similar the past was to the current situation.

For example, a person may use the similarity heuristic when deciding on a book purchase. If a novel has a plot similar to that of novels read and enjoyed or the author has a writing style similar to that of favored authors, the purchasing decision will be positively influenced. A book with similar characteristics to previously pleasurable books is likely to also be enjoyed, causing the person to decide to obtain it.

== Background ==
The similarity heuristic directly emphasizes learning from past experience. For example, the similarity heuristic has been observed indirectly in experiments such as phonological similarity tests. These tests observe how well a person can distinguish similar sounds from dissimilar ones based on a comparison to previously heard sounds. While not involving a decision making process characteristic to heuristics in general, these studies show a reliance on past experience and comparison to the current experience. In addition, the similarity heuristic has become a valuable tool in the field of economics and consumerism.

== Real-world examples ==
The similarity heuristic is very easy to observe in the world of business, both from a marketing standpoint and from the position of the consumer. People tend to let past experience shape their world view; thus, if something presents itself as similar to a good experience had in the past, it is likely that the individual will partake in the current experience. The reverse holds true for situations that have proven unfavorable. A very basic example of this concept is a person deciding to get a meal at a particular restaurant because it reminds them of a similar establishment.

=== Marketing ===
Companies often use the similarity heuristic as a marketing strategy. For example, companies will often advertise their services as something similar to a successful competitor, but better — such a concept is evident in the motion picture industry. Trailers for upcoming films will promote the latest movie as being made by a particular director, citing said director's past film credentials. In effect, a similarity heuristic is created in an audience's mind; creating a similarity between the coming attraction and past successes will likely make people decide to see the upcoming film.

Automotive parts companies and their distributors and dealers leverage similarity heuristics when they interchange the term, "OEM" (original equipment manufacturer), and "OE" (original equipment). For example, the OE design specifications may ask for a certain durability factor, corrosion resistance, and material composition. The OEM realizes they can produce the same part less expensively and with possibly greater profit, if they do not adhere to all or most of the OE design specifications. By marketing their product as "OEM" against a well-known brand or product (e.g., Mercedes-Benz), they predict that enough customers will purchase their OEM product vs. the OE product. The converse happens when the OE factory (e.g., Mercedes-Benz) promotes their brand of a commodity product (e.g., anti-freeze/coolant, spark plugs, etc.) as superior or better quality than the commodity product.

In addition, the use of a reverse similarity heuristic can be a highly valuable marketing tool. For example, when Nintendo wished to launch its Nintendo Entertainment System (NES) in the United States, it did so in the middle of a video game depression; Atari had managed to make video games one of the least popular American pastimes. Initial showing of the NES were met poorly — clearly, a similarity heuristic was in place, and people had created biases against anything relating to interactive television gaming. Nintendo's goal, then, became the differentiation of their system from the past examples. Employing a dissimilarity heuristic, Nintendo managed to create enough of a gap from the former video game industry and market a successful product.

=== Hiring ===
Job interviews often use similarity heuristic in identifying candidates suitable for the culture within the company. The Human Resource rounds of job interviews often focus on educational background and experiences of candidates that can qualify them for similarity or dissimilarity with the employees promoted within the company.

=== Legacy admissions ===
Similarity heuristic is sometimes used in legacy preferences to strengthen the candidacy of applicants in admissions of educational institutions. It's argued, implicitly, that kids of alumni will often find themselves in the company of other similarly situated family friends, and hence be more likely to be successful themselves.

=== Problem Solving ===
Some professions, such as software developers, regularly utilize the similarity heuristic. For software developers, the similarity heuristic is utilized when performing debugging tasks. A software bug exhibits a set of symptoms indicating the existence of a problem. In general, similar symptoms are caused by similar types of programming errors. By comparing these symptoms with those of previously corrected software flaws, a developer is able to determine the most probable cause and take an effective course of action. Over time, a developer’s past experiences will allow their use of the similarity heuristic to be highly effective, quickly choosing the debugging approach that will likely reveal the problem’s source.

Problem solving in general is benefited by the similarity heuristic. When new problems arise similar to previous problems, the similarity heuristic selects an approach that previously yielded favorable results. Even if the current problem is novel, any similarity to previous issues will help choose a proper course of action.

== See also ==
- Case-based reasoning
- Inductive reasoning
- Similarity (philosophy)
