= Affect heuristic =

Mental shortcut based on emotion

The affect heuristic is a heuristic, a mental shortcut that allows people to make decisions and solve problems quickly and efficiently, in which current emotion—fear, pleasure, surprise, etc.—influences decisions. In other words, it is a type of heuristic in which emotional response, or "affect" in psychological terms, plays a lead role. It is a subconscious process that shortens the decision-making process and allows people to function without having to complete an extensive search for information. It is shorter in duration than a mood, occurring rapidly and involuntarily in response to a stimulus. Reading the words "lung cancer" usually generates an affect of dread, while reading the words "mother's love" usually generates a feeling of affection and comfort. The affect heuristic is typically used while judging the risks and benefits of something, depending on the positive or negative feelings that people associate with a stimulus. It is the equivalent of "going with your gut". If their feelings towards an activity are positive, then people are more likely to judge the risks as low and the benefits high. On the other hand, if their feelings towards an activity are negative, they are more likely to perceive the risks as high and benefits low.

== Concept ==
The theory of affect heuristic is that a human being's affect can influence how he or she makes decisions. Research has shown that risk and benefits are negatively correlated in people's minds. This was found after researchers found that the inverse relationship between perceived risk and perceived benefit of an activity was linked to the strength of positive or negative affect associated with the activity as measured by rating the activity on bipolar scales (e.g. good/bad). This implies that people base their judgements of an activity or a technology not only on what they think about it, but also on how they feel about it. The affect heuristic gained early attention in 1980 when Robert B. Zajonc argued that affective reactions to stimuli are often the first reaction which occur automatically and subsequently influencing the way in which we process and judge information. The affect heuristic received more recent attention when it was used to explain the unexpected negative correlation between benefit and risk perception. Finucane, Alhakami, Slovic and Johnson theorized in 2000 that a good feeling towards a situation (i.e., positive affect) would lead to a lower risk perception and a higher benefit perception, even when this is logically not warranted for that situation. This implies that a strong emotional response to a word or other stimulus might alter a person's judgment. He or she might make different decisions based on the same set of facts and might thus make an illogical decision. Overall, the affect heuristic is of influence in nearly every decision-making arena.

=== Theoretical accounts of affect ===
An alternative thought to the “gut feeling” response is Antonio Damasio's somatic marker hypothesis. It is the opinion that thought is made largely from images which include perceptual and symbolic representations. These images then become “marked” by positive or negative feelings linked directly or indirectly to somatic states. When a negative somatic marker is linked to an image of a future outcome, it sounds an alarm in the brain. When a positive marker is linked to an image, it becomes a signal of incentive. He hypothesized that somatic markers increase the accuracy of the decision process and the absence of these markers, mostly seen in people with certain types of brain damage, degrades the ability to make good decisions. This hypothesis arose when observing patients with damage to their prefrontal cortex who had severe impairments in personal and social decision-making despite their other abilities.

== Thought and feeling ==
It has been argued by researchers that people use affect heuristics as a first response to an issue, they rely on spontaneous affective reactions which make it more efficient than having to research and analyze external information. Slovic, Finucane, Peters and MacGregor (2005) contrast two modes of thinking: the analytic system and the experiential system. The analytic system, also referred to as the rational system, is thought that is considered to be slow and requires effort; it requires consciousness, probabilities, logical reasoning, and substantial evidence. The experiential system is the exact opposite. It is intuitive and mostly automatic which makes it more convenient for people because it does not require effort or consciousness. It relies on images, metaphors, and narratives which are then used to estimate the probability of a hazard. This is due to the experience of affect, in other words, a “gut feeling.” Multiple studies including the one done by Miller and Ireland (2005) show how "gut feeling" or intuitive decisions affect various executives and managers of many companies. Many of the individuals studied use intuition as an effective approach to making important decisions. The experimenters' goal is to evaluate the risk and benefits of using intuition. Their results show that this is a troublesome decision tool. Affective reactions that accompany judgements are not necessarily voluntary, but are automatic responses. Zajonc states that “one might be able to control the expression of emotion, but not the experience of it itself.” However, he also clarifies that feelings are not free of thought and that thoughts are not free of feeling. The experiential system also takes past experiences into account. In other words, if a person has already experienced a certain issue, he or she is more likely to take more precautions towards the issue.

== Experimental findings ==
Many studies have been done to further look into affect heuristics and many have found that these heuristics shape our attitudes and opinions towards our decisions, especially risk perception. These studies demonstrate how affect is an important characteristic of the decision-making process in many different domains and aspects as well as how it can lead to a strong conditioner of preference. As demonstrated below, affect is independent of cognition which indicate that there are conditions where affect does not require cognition.

=== Subliminal affective response ===
The cause of affect does not necessarily have to be consciously perceived. A study conducted by Winkielman, Zajonc and Schwarz (1997) demonstrated the speed at which an affective reaction can influence judgements. To do this they used a subliminal priming paradigm where participants were "primed" through exposure to either a smiling face, a frowning face, or a neutral polygon presented at about 1/250 of a second. This was considered an amount of time where the nature of the stimuli could not be recalled. Participants were then exposed to an ideograph (e.g. a Chinese character) for two seconds and asked to rate the ideograph on a scale of liking. Researchers found that participants preferred the ideograph preceded with a smiling face as opposed to those preceded by a frowning face or neutral polygon despite the fact that the smiling face was only shown for 1/250 of a second.

The same experiment demonstrated the persistence of initial affect. During a second session, participations were primed with the same characters, but these characters were preceded by a different face that they were not previously exposed to (e.g. those previously exposed to the smiling face were now exposed to the neutral polygon). Participants continued to show preference for the characters based on the first association, even though the second exposure was preceded by a different affective stimulus. In other words, the second priming was ineffective because the effects of the first priming still remained. If the participant liked a character following exposure to a smiling face, they would continue to like the character even when it was preceded by a frowning face during the second exposure. (The experimental outcome was statistically significant and adjusted for variables such as non-affective preference for certain characters).

=== Insensitivity to numbers ===
Sometimes affective responses to certain stimuli are a result of a lack of sensitivity to other factors, for example, numbers. Slovic and Peters (2006) did a study on psychophysical numbing, the inability to discriminate change in a physical stimulus as the magnitude of the stimulus increases, and found that students more strongly supported an airport-safety measure that was expected to save a high percentage of 150 lives at risk as opposed to a measure that was expected to save 150 lives. This is thought to have occurred because although saving 150 lives is good, it is somewhat harder to comprehend and thus the decision comes from the positive feeling associated with the higher percentage.

=== The influence of time ===
Research has been conducted in the influence that time plays in decision-making. In two experiments, Finucane, Alhakami, Slovic and Johnson (2000) studied the affect heuristic under time pressure and the influence that providing risk and benefit information has on the affect heuristic. The researchers compared individuals under no time pressure and those with time pressure. They predicted that individuals under time pressure would rely more heavily on their affect in order to be more efficient in their responses whereas those under no time pressure would use more logic in their decision-making. To do this, university students were randomly assigned to one of the two conditions (time pressure or no time pressure) and one of the two counterbalancing orders (risk judgements followed by benefit judgements or vice versa). They were then given a task in which they had to make judgements about the risk or benefit of certain activities and technologies. As predicted, individuals in the time-pressure condition took less time to make risk judgements than did individuals in the no time pressure condition. In the second experiment, students again had to make judgements about certain activities, but this time were given additional information about the risk and benefits. Information was framed as being high risk, low risk, high benefit or low benefit. The researchers found that this additional information did in fact influence their judgements.

Two similar studies were conducted by Wilson and Arvai in 2006, in which they also looked at the affect heuristic affects high and low risk options. These experiments examine the affect heuristic and the “evaluability hypothesis”, the joint evaluation when options are evaluated in a side-by-side comparison and separate evaluation where options are evaluated on their own. They take this concept and discuss how it relates to the affect heuristic by specifically looking at making traits of an option more or less meaningful in terms of the context of choice, more specifically, affect. To examine this relationship more closely, they conducted two experiments where participants received quantitative information about the nature of risks and were placed in one of two groups: affect-poor combined with high risks and affect-rich combined with low risks. In their first study, they looked how the influence of affect on evaluability in joint evaluations as compared to separate evaluations. To this, participants were asked to make choices about the affect-rich problem of crime and the affect-poor problem of deer overpopulation. Participants were asked to rate how they perceived crime and deer overpopulation by rating on a scale from "very good" to "very bad." They found that participants ignored the quantitative information and focused on the affect characteristics.

=== Fear appeals ===
Health campaigns often use “fear appeals” to grab the attention of their audience. Fear appeals are a type of advertising that specifically uses methods of creating anxiety in the consumer which results in the consumer wanting to cure this fear by purchasing the product. In a study by Averbeck, Jones, and Robertson (2011), researchers look at how prior knowledge influences one's response to fear appeals. Surveys were distributed which manipulated prior knowledge as low or high and two different topics: sleep deprivation or spinal meningitis. Various scale were used to test how prior knowledge affects certain health-related issues. Researchers found that individuals who had prior knowledge in a certain subject exhibited less fear and were least likely to fall prey to the affect heuristic as opposed to individuals that did not have prior knowledge who exhibited more fear and were more likely to fall prey.

Another example of how fear appeals are used in marketing today is through the findings presented in the experiment by Schmitt and Blass (2008). They produced two versions of an anti-smoking film. One contained high fear arousal and one did not. Out of the participants (46 non-smoking students and 5 smoking students), those who viewed the high fear-arousal version expressed stronger anti-smoking behavioral intentions than those who viewed the low fear-arousal version.

=== Climate change ===
Research has shown that Americans are aware of climate change, but do not consider it to be a serious problem due to the lack of an affective response. Many people report as not having experienced the consequences of climate change or that it is a long-term consequence that will not happen in the near future. Therefore, it is considered to be of lower priority and not much is done as a solution to global climate change.

=== Risk communication ===
Research on the affect heuristic had its origin in risk perception. Communicating risk is meant to improve the correspondence between the magnitude of the risk of an issue and the magnitude to which people respond to that risk. Affect, specifically negative affect, is an important method for increasing perceived risk considering its influences on perceived risk and thus has been utilized as essential for communicating risk to the public.

Raising risk awareness is thought to be increased when risk information is presented in the form of frequences (e.g. “Within 40 years there is a 33% probability of flood”) or probabilities (e.g. “Each year there is a 1% probability of flood). This method is thought to evoke an affective response which then increases the availability of risk which results in greater perceived risk. This demonstrates how the way in which information is presented influences the way in which people interpret the information, more specifically, potential risks. Research also shows that people's financial risk taking is affected by their emotional state,

The affect heuristic is certainly evident in product innovations we see in the market. The processes consumers use to weigh the potential risk and benefits associated with purchasing such innovations are in constant motion. A study by Slovic and King (2014) tries to explain this specific phenomenon. Their experiment addresses the extent to which feelings dominate early perceptions of new products. Participants were exposed to three innovations in pretest and posttest design. Through this study, they concluded that risks and benefits associated with innovations are related to the consumer's evaluations of the products.

==== Cancer ====
Researchers have looked at the affective and experiential modes of thinking in terms of cancer prevention. Research has shown that affect plays a significant role in whether people choose to get screened for certain types of cancer. Current research is now looking into how to communicate the risks and benefits of cancer prevention and treatment options. So far research has shown that the way in which information is framed does play a role in the way in which the information is interpreted. Research has also shown that treatment options may not have significant meaning to patients unless it has an affective connection. It is for this reason that researchers are looking into using affective coding such as icon arrays to make numerical information easier to understand and process.

=== Air Pollution ===
An experiment composed by Hine and Marks (2007) examines the role of affect heuristics in maintaining wood-burning behavior. The individuals analyzed in this study were 256 residents of a small Australian city where high levels of wood smoke pollution are present. With the negative effects of air pollution evident, their studies found that individuals who used wood heaters exhibited less support for wood smoke control policies. These individuals were aware that their wood heaters were part of the problem. Even with that awareness, their positive affections and emotions towards wood heating trumped all negative evidence for it.

=== Smiling ===
Research has been done on how smiling can cause affective responses and thus influence our opinions of others. An experiment by LaFrance and Hecht (1995) investigated whether a smiling target would elicit more leniency than those that do not. Participants judged a case of potential academic misconduct and were asked to rate a list of subjects. Materials included photos of a female target either showing a neutral expression, felt smile, false smile, or miserable smile. Researchers found that the student pictured as smiling received less punishment than did the student who did not smile despite the fact that the smiling student was not seen as less guilty. They did not find a significant difference between the different smiles. Smiling students were also rated as more trustworthy, honest, genuine, good, obedient, sincere, and admirable compared to the student that did not smile.

To the previous studies evidence, there is further evidence on the effect of smiling on a person’s perception. They contain it in the experiment by Delevati and Cesar (1994). Brazilian undergraduates perceived a slide of a male and female person. Smiling faces were portrayed and non-smiling faces were portrayed. The participants used 12 different adjectives to judge the portraits. Results showed those persons showing a smile received more favorable perceptions than those who did not. Generally speaking, a smiling person can produce warmer feelings in the perceiver than the non-smiling person.

=== Memory load ===
Researchers have studied how one's memory load increases one's chances of using the affect heuristic. In a study by Shiv and Fedorikhin (1999), participants were asked to either memorize a two-digit number (low cognitive demand) or a seven-digit number (high cognitive demand). Participants were then asked to enter another room where they would report their number. On the way there, they were asked for their preference for two snacks: chocolate cake (more favorable affect, less favorable cognition) or fruit salad (less favorable affect, more favorable cognition). Researchers predicted that participants given the seven-digits to remember (high cognitive load) would reduce their deliberation process due to having to remember a large amount of information. This would increase the chances of these participants choosing the cake over the fruit salad due to it being the more affectively favorable option. This hypothesis proved true with participants choosing the chocolate cake 63% of the time when given a high cognitive load and only 41% when given a low cognitive load. In the same study they also tested the impulsiveness of the participants in moderating the effects of processing-resources of choice and at the time they were asked for their preference for the two snacks high cognitive demand chose the chocolate cake 84.2%. This provides evidence that people's decisions can be influenced by affect heuristic in a relatively spontaneous manner from the stimulus, with little involvement of higher-order cognitive demand.

=== Lasting effects ===
Another common situation involving affect heuristic is where a strong, emotional first impression can inform a decision, even if subsequent evidence weight cognitively against the original decision made. In a study by Sherman, Kim and Zajonc (1998), they investigated how long the induced effects of an affective response could last. Participants were asked to study Chinese characters and their English meanings. Half of the meanings were positive (e.g. beauty) and the other half negative (e.g. disease). Participants were then tested on these meanings, which was followed by a task in which they were given pairs of characters and asked to choose which character they preferred. Researchers found that participants preferred the character with a positive meaning.

In the same experiment, participants were given a new task where the characters were presented with a neutral meaning (e.g. linen) and participants were told that these were the true meanings of the character. The testing procedure was the same and despite exposing participants with the new meanings, their preferences in characters remained the same. Characters that were paired with positive meanings continued to be preferred.

== Disadvantages ==
While heuristics can be helpful in many situations, it can also lead to biases which can result in poor decision-making habits. Like other heuristics, the affect heuristic can provide efficient and adaptive responses, but relying on affect can also cause decisions to be misleading.

=== Smoking ===
Studies have looked at how the affect influences smoking behavior. Smokers tend to act experientially in the sense that they give little conscious thought to the risks before they start. It is usually as a result of affective responses in the moment that occur when seeing others partake in the behavior. Epstein (1995) found that there has been quite a bit of manipulation of consumers when it comes to packaging and marketing products. This is especially the case with tobacco companies. Research has shown that cigarette advertisements were designed to increase the positive affect associated with smoking and decrease the perceptions of risk. Therefore, seeing this advertisement could lead people astray to start smoking because of its induced appeal. In a study by Slovic et al. (2005), he released a survey to smokers in which he asked “If you had it to do all over again, would you start smoking?” and more than 85% of adult smokers and about 80% of young smokers (between the ages of 14 and 22) answered “No.” He found that most smokers, especially those that start at a younger age, do not take the time and think about how their future selves will perceive the risks associated with smoking. Essentially, smokers give little conscious thought to smoking before they start and it is usually after they have started smoking and have become addicted that they learn new information about health risk.
