= Yitzhak Melamed =

Israeli-American philosopher

- יצחק יוחנן מלמד
- Born: Yitzhak Yohanan Melamed; 7 March 1968 (age 58); Bnei Brak, Israel
- Awards: Fulbright Fellowship, NEH Fellowship, Humboldt Fellowship

Education
- Education: Tel Aviv University (BA, MA); Yale University (PhD)
- Thesis: The Metaphysics of Substance and the Metaphysics of Thought in Spinoza (2005)
- Doctoral advisor: Michael Della Rocca

Philosophical work
- Era: Contemporary philosophy
- Region: Western philosophy
- School: Analytic philosophy
- Institutions: University of Chicago; Johns Hopkins University
- Main interests: Metaphysics, early modern philosophy, German idealism, Jewish philosophy, philosophy of religion, political philosophy
- Notable ideas: Two doctrines of parallelism in Spinoza's philosophy

Yitzhak Yohanan Melamed (Hebrew: יצחק יוחנן מלמד; born 7 March 1968) is an Israeli philosopher and a leading scholar of Spinoza and modern philosophy. He is the Charlotte Bloomberg Professor of Philosophy at Johns Hopkins University. He holds a master's degree in history & philosophy of science from Tel Aviv University and a philosophy PhD from Yale University. Melamed has won numerous fellowships and grants, including the Fulbright (1996-8), American Academy for Jewish Research (2003-5), Mellon (2005), Humboldt (2011), NEH (2012), and ACLS-Burkhardt (2012) Fellowships, and taught intensive masterclasses at the University of Toronto (2016), École normale supérieure de Lyon (2016), Peking University (2017), and the École des hautes études en sciences sociales (2019). He is a founding co-editor of the Gross Library of Jewish Philosophy (Oxford University Press, 2026-), and co-editor of the Elements in the Philosophy of Benedict de Spinoza series (Cambridge University Press, 2026-).

== Academic activity ==
Melamed is a graduate of Tel Aviv University and attended Yale University from 1996 to 2005. In 2005, he earned his doctorate at Yale with the topic The Metaphysics of Substance and the Metaphysics of Thought in Spinoza. He was an assistant professor at the University of Chicago between 2005 and 2008 before becoming an associate professor at Johns Hopkins in 2010, receiving full professorship in 2013. As of 2021, he lived in Pikesville, Maryland.

In 2019 he analyzed two manuscripts of the Korte Verhandeling that were discovered in the mid-nineteenth century. The first manuscript was an appendix compiled with the geometrical method of the Spinoza's Ethics, but without providing any definition. The second appendix was presented as the earliest known version of the major work of the Dutch philosopher. From Spinoza's letters he also ascertained that the earliest editions of the Ethics would have been published under the title of ‘Philosophy’.

In 2021, Melamed was banned from the Portuguese Synagogue in Amsterdam for his studies on Spinoza's banned works. Melamed posted a letter by Rabbi Joseph Serfaty, who represented Amsterdam's Sephardic community, after which the Ma'amad publicly reversed the decision. A ban on filming was reinstated when Melamed arrived at the Portuguese Synagogue to film footage of the Ets Haim library inside.

== Personal life ==
Melamed was born in Bnei Brak. He was raised on the border of the Haredi world, and currently identifies as an observant Jew.

In March 2001, while attending Yale University, Melamed was arrested for disorderly conduct at a Yale Political Union event, after he shouted questions at the invited speaker, former Knesset member and leader of the radical settlers in Hebron, Elyakim Haetzni. Melamed later stated that as a child of two holocaust survivors he was "educated not to stand idle in the face of racism", comparing Haetzni to the Ku Klux Klan and criticising him further for past statements in which Haetzni called for former Israeli prime ministers Shimon Peres and Yitzhak Rabin to be tried for treason due to their signing of the Oslo, peace agreements, with the Palestinians.

=== 2018 assault in Bonn ===
On 11 July 2018, while a visiting scholar for the University of Bonn, Melamed was in the Hofgarten to hold a public lecture when he was attacked by a 20-year-old man, who shouted antisemitic abuse at him and a female professor in English and German before hitting Melamed in the head, knocking off his kippah. Shortly after, Melamed was pushed to the ground, beaten, and handcuffed by police who had been alerted by the colleague who reported on a "clash between two foreigners [Ausländer]." Police officials later stated that the officers had mistakenly assumed that Melamed was the aggressor because they saw him chase after the other man upon arrival. The attacker, a German citizen of Palestinian descent with a prior conviction for armed robbery, was caught on 17 July after he was reported for threatening passerby with a knife in Hofgarten and sentenced to four years imprisonment on 14 October 2019 on one charge of Volksverhetzung.

The Chief of Bonn Police Ursula Brohl-Sowa and the right wing Interior Minister of North Rhine-Westphalia Herbert Reul issued apologies the next day. All four officers involved in the incident were investigated by their colleagues - in Germany, at least at the time, only the police would investigate itself - for obstruction of justice for attempting to persuade Melamed into keeping quiet about the injuries he sustained during the arrest, an allegation the officers consistently denied and instead accused Melamed in resisting heavily. They were subsequently transferred to other posts, but no charges were brought against any of them because the police investigation concluded that no illegal conduct had occurred. Bonn officials rescheduled a "Day of the Kippah" event planned for November to instead take place on 19 July in solidarity against antisemitsm. Responding to a policeman who warned him "not to mess-up with the [German] police," Melamed told the policeman he has little fear of the German police which has already killed his uncle, an aunt, and two of his grandparents on the same day in September 1942,. In an interview, Melamed reasserted his commitment to a reconciliation between Israelis and Palestinians.

== Books ==
- Spinoza’s Labyrinths: Essays on His Metaphysics. New York: Oxford University Press, 2025. xxv+253 pp.
- The Oxford Handbook of Jewish Philosophy, eds. Yitzhak Y. Melamed and Paul W. Franks (Oxford: Oxford University Press, 2026).
- Baruch Spinoza: Life, Works and Philosophy [in Hebrew]. Jerusalem: Shazar Center Press, 2024. 184 pp.
- Modality: A History, eds. Yitzhak Y. Melamed & Samuel Newlands (New York: Oxford University Press, 2024).
- Spinoza’s Metaphysics: Substance and Thought (Oxford: Oxford University Press, 2013). xxii+232 pp. Paperback: 2014. French translation: Spinoza. Substance et pensée. Translated into French by Dan Arbib. Paris: PUF-Épimethée, 2025. Italian: LA METAFISICA DI SPINOZA: SOSTANZA E PENSIERO. Translated into Italian by Emanuele Costa. Milan: Mimesis Edizioni, 2020. Chinese: Spinoza’s Metaphysics: Substance and Thought. Translated into Chinese by Hao Dong. Beijing: Commercial Press, 2024. vii+395 pp.
- Solomon Maimon’s Autobiography, translated by Paul Reitter. Edited and introduced by Yitzhak Y. Melamed and Abraham P. Socher (Princeton: Princeton University Press, 2019).
- Blackwell Companion to Spinoza, ed. Yitzhak Y. Melamed (Oxford: Blackwell, 2021).
- Spinoza’s Political Treatise: A Critical Guide, eds. Yitzhak Y. Melamed and Hasana Sharp (Cambridge: Cambridge University Press, 2018). ISBN 978-1-107-17058-2.
- Spinoza’s Ethics: A Critical Guide, ed. Yitzhak Y. Melamed (Cambridge: Cambridge University Press, 2017).
- Eternity: A History, ed. Yitzhak Y. Melamed (New York: Oxford University Press, 2016). ISBN 978-0-19-978186-7.
- The Young Spinoza: A Metaphysician in the Making, ed. Yitzhak Y. Melamed (Oxford: Oxford University, 2015).
- Spinoza and German Idealism, eds. Eckart Förster and Yitzhak Y. Melamed (Cambridge: Cambridge University Press, 2012).
- Spinoza’s Theological-Political Treatise: A Critical Guide, eds. Yitzhak Y. Melamed and Michael Rosenthal (Cambridge: Cambridge University Press, 2010).

== Influential articles ==
- “Spinoza’s causa sui” in The Blackwell Companion to Spinoza, ed. Yitzhak Y. Melamed (Oxford: Blackwell, 2021), 116–125. ""
- “The Earliest Draft of Spinoza’s Ethics” in Charles Ramond and Jack Stetter (eds.), Spinoza in 21st-Century French and American Philosophy. Metaphysics, Philosophy of Mind, Moral and Political Philosophy. Bloomsbury, 2019, 93–112.
- “The Building Blocks of Spinoza’s Metaphysics: Substance, Attributes, and Modes” in Michael Della Rocca (ed.), The Oxford Handbook of Spinoza (Oxford: Oxford University Press, 2017), 84–113.
- “Spinoza’s Metaphysics of Thought: Parallelisms and the Multifaceted Structure of Ideas,” Philosophy & Phenomenological Research 86 (2013), 636–683.
- “Charitable Interpretations and the Political Domestication of Spinoza, or, Benedict in the Land of the Secular Imagination” in Eric Schlisser, Mogens Laerke and Justin Smith (eds.), The Methodology of the History of Philosophy (Oxford: Oxford University Press, 2013), 258–279.
- “Spinoza’s Deification of Existence”, Oxford Studies in Early Modern Philosophy 6 (2012), 75–104.
- “ ‘Omnis determinatio est negatio’ – Determination, Negation and Self-Negation in Spinoza, Kant, and Hegel” in Eckart Förster and Yitzhak Melamed (eds.), Spinoza and German Idealism (Cambridge: Cambridge University Press, 2012), 175–96.
- “Acosmism or Weak Individuals? Hegel, Spinoza, and the Reality of the Finite”, Journal of the History of Philosophy 48 (2010), 77–92.
- “Spinoza’s Metaphysics of Substance: The Substance-Mode Relation as a Relation of Inherence and Predication”, Philosophy & Phenomenological Research (78:1) January 2009, 17–82.
- “Salomon Maimon and the Rise of Spinozism in German Idealism,” Journal of the History of Philosophy 42 (January 2004), 67–96.
