= Wallace Matson =

American philosopher (1921–2012)

- Born: Wallace I. Matson; 1921
- Died: March 3, 2012
- Awards: Guggenheim Fellowship (1961)

Philosophical work
- Era: Contemporary philosophy
- Region: Western philosophy
- School: Analytic philosophy
- Institutions: University of Washington; University of California, Berkeley
- Doctoral students: Michael Della Rocca; Brian E. O'Neil
- Main interests: History of philosophy, ancient philosophy, philosophy of religion, philosophy of mind, epistemology, ethics

Wallace I. Matson (1921–2012) was an American philosopher and a professor of philosophy at the University of California, Berkeley. He is known for his works on the existence of God.

== Biography ==
Matson was Professor of Philosophy at University of California, Berkeley (1955-1991) and Assistant Professor of Philosophy at University of Washington 1950–1955. Matson was an atheist. In 1978, he debated Thomas B. Warren on the existence of God.

== Books ==
- The Existence of God (1965)
- Sentience (1976)
- A History of Philosophy (1968), revised and published in 2 volumes as A New History of Philosophy (1987), and revised again (2000)
- The Warren-Matson Debate on the Existence of God (1978)
- Uncorrected Papers (2006)
- Grand Theories and Everyday Beliefs: Science, Philosophy, and Their Histories, Oxford University Press, 2011
