= Karl Ameriks =

American philosopher (1947–2025)

- Born: Karl Peter Ameriks; November 5, 1947; Munich, Bavaria, Allied-occupied Germany
- Died: April 28, 2025 (aged 77); Mishawaka, Indiana, U.S.
- Awards: American Academy of Arts and Sciences Fellowship

Education
- Education: Yale University (A.B. 1969; Ph.D., 1973)
- Thesis: Cartesianism and Wittgenstein: The Legacy of Subjectivism in Contemporary Philosophy of Mind (1973)
- Doctoral advisor: Karsten Harries

Philosophical work
- Era: Contemporary philosophy
- Region: Western philosophy
- School: Kantianism
- Institutions: University of Notre Dame
- Notable students: Rachel Zuckert
- Main interests: Philosophy of mind
- Notable ideas: The importance of autonomy in post-Kantian philosophy

Karl Peter Ameriks (November 5, 1947 – April 28, 2025) was an American philosopher. He was the Emeritus McMahon-Hank Professor of Philosophy at the University of Notre Dame.

== Life and career ==
Ameriks was born on November 5, 1947. He studied at Yale University (A.B. summa cum laude, 1969; Ph.D., 1973), where he wrote his doctoral thesis under the direction of Karsten Harries. He joined the faculty at Notre Dame in 1973, and taught there for more than forty years.

He was regarded as one of the foremost scholars of the philosophy of Immanuel Kant and has written widely in the history of late modern and Continental philosophy. Ameriks co-edited the series Cambridge Texts in the History of Philosophy. He organized influential conferences, including one on Kant (featuring Onora O’Neill) and one on German Idealism (featuring Manfred Frank).

He was elected a Fellow of the American Academy of Arts and Sciences in 2009.

Karl Ameriks died on April 28, 2025, at the age of 77.

== Bibliography ==
- Kant's Theory of Mind: An Analysis of the Paralogisms of Pure Reason (Oxford: Clarendon Press, 1982; expanded ed., 2000)
- Kant and the Fate of Autonomy: Problems in the Appropriation of the Critical Philosophy (Cambridge: Cambridge Univ. Press, 2000)
- Interpreting Kant's Critiques (Oxford: Clarendon Press, 2003)
- Kant and the Historical Turn: Philosophy as Critical Interpretation (Oxford: Clarendon Press, 2006)
- Kant's Elliptical Path (Oxford: Clarendon Press, 2012)
- Kantian Subjects: Critical Philosophy and Late Modernity (Oxford, 2019)
- Kantian Dignity and its Difficulties (Oxford, 2024)

== See also ==
- American philosophy
