= Robert Hanna (philosopher) =

Canadian philosopher

- Born: Robert Alan Hanna; 1957 (age 68–69); Regina, Saskatchewan, Canada
- Spouse: Martha Hanna

Education
- Education: University of Winnipeg; Victoria College, Toronto (BA, 1979); Catholic University of America (MA, 1983); Yale University (MPhil, 1985; PhD, 1989)
- Thesis: The Nature and Philosophical Significance of Empirical Judgement (1989)
- Doctoral advisor: Karsten Harries
- Other advisors: Ruth Barcan Marcus, Geoffrey Payzant, Robert Sokolowski

Philosophical work
- Era: Contemporary philosophy
- Region: Western philosophy
- School: Kantianism
- Institutions: University of Cambridge; University of Colorado Boulder
- Main interests: Metaphysics, epistemology, philosophy of mind, logic and rationality, history of analytic philosophy
- Notable ideas: See list: Causal-dynamical structuralist interpretation of Immanuel Kant's theory of matter, cognitive-semantic interpretation of transcendental idealism, embodied agency theory, Kantian liberal naturalism, Kantian manifest realism, Kantian nonconceptualism, Kantian weak transcendental idealism (world-conformity to innate cognitive faculties), practical foundations of the exact sciences, "two property" (or "two concept") interpretation of transcendental idealism

Robert Alan Hanna (born 1957) is a Canadian independent philosopher and the director of the philosophical working group Philosophy without Borders (PWB).

== Life and work ==
Hanna received his PhD in philosophy from Yale University in 1989 with a thesis supervised by Karsten Harries. Hanna has written works on logic and rationality, Immanuel Kant, analytic philosophy, and the philosophy of mind and knowledge.

In his work on Immanuel Kant, Hanna developed a cognitive-semantic interpretation of transcendental idealism. On this interpretation, the power of judgment is the central cognitive capacity through which intuition, conceptualization, imagination, and reason are unified in a single act of rational self-consciousness; thus, transcendental idealism becomes a theory of the a priori conditions under which objective experience and truth-apt judgment are possible.

Hanna previously taught at the University of Cambridge and the University of Colorado Boulder.

== Selected publications ==
=== Monographs ===
- Hanna, Robert (2001-07-19). Kant and the Foundations of Analytic Philosophy. Oxford University Press. doi:10.1093/acprof:oso/9780199272044.001.0001. ISBN 978-0-19-825072-2.
- Hanna, Robert (2006-07-14). Rationality and Logic. The MIT Press. doi:10.7551/mitpress/5758.001.0001. ISBN 978-0-262-27485-2.
- Hanna, Robert (2006-10-01). Kant, Science, and Human Nature. Oxford University Press. doi:10.1093/acprof:oso/9780199285549.001.0001. ISBN 978-0-19-928554-9.
- Hanna, Robert; Maiese, Michelle (2009-01-08). Embodied Minds in Action. Oxford University Press. doi:10.1093/oso/9780199230310.001.0001. ISBN 978-0-19-923031-0.
- Hanna, Robert (2015-10-01). Cognition, Content, and the A Priori: A Study in the Philosophy of Mind and Knowledge. Oxford University Press. doi:10.1093/acprof:oso/9780198716297.001.0001. ISBN 978-0-19-871629-7.
- Maiese, Michelle; Hanna, Robert (2019-07-15). The Mind-Body Politic. Palgrave Macmillan. doi:10.1007/978-3-030-19546-5. ISBN 978-3-030-19545-8.

== Sources ==
- Hanna, Robert, Kant, Science, and Human Nature. Clarendon Press, 2006.
