= Material inference =

Process in logic

In logic, inference is the process of deriving logical conclusions from premises known or assumed to be true. In checking a logical inference for formal and material validity, the meaning of only its logical vocabulary and of both its logical and extra-logical vocabulary is considered, respectively.

== Examples ==
For example, the inference "Socrates is a human, and each human must eventually die, therefore Socrates must eventually die" is a formally valid inference; it remains valid if the nonlogical vocabulary "Socrates", "is human", and "must eventually die" is arbitrarily, but consistently replaced. (Note: A completely fictitious, but formally valid inference obtained by consistent replacement is e.g. "Buckbeak is a unicorn, and each unicorn has gills, therefore Buckbeak has gills".)

In contrast, the inference "Montreal is north of New York, therefore New York is south of Montreal" is materially valid only; its validity relies on the extra-logical relations "is north of" and "is south of" being converse to each other. (Note: A completely fictitious, but materially (and formally) invalid inference obtained by consistent replacement is e.g. "Hagrid is younger than Albus, therefore Albus is larger than Hagrid". Consistent replacement doesn't respect conversity.)

== Material inferences vs. enthymemes ==
Classical formal logic considers the above "north/south" inference as an enthymeme, that is, as an incomplete inference; it can be made formally valid by supplementing the tacitly used conversity relationship explicitly: "Montreal is north of New York, and whenever a location x is north of a location y, then y is south of x; therefore New York is south of Montreal".

In contrast, the notion of a material inference has been developed by Wilfrid Sellars in order to emphasize his view that such supplements are not necessary to obtain a correct argument.

== Brandom on material inference ==
=== Non-monotonic inference ===
Robert Brandom adopted Sellars' view, arguing that everyday (practical) reasoning is usually non-monotonic, i.e. additional premises can turn a practically valid inference into an invalid one, e.g.

1. "If I rub this match along the striking surface, then it will ignite." (p→q)
2. "If p, but the match is inside a strong electromagnetic field, then it will not ignite." (p∧r→¬q)
3. "If p and r, but the match is in a Faraday cage, then it will ignite." (p∧r∧s→q)
4. "If p and r and s, but there is no oxygen in the room, then the match will not ignite." (p∧r∧s∧t→¬q)
5. ...

Therefore, practically valid inference is different from formally valid inference (which is monotonic - the above argument that Socrates must eventually die cannot be challenged by whatever additional information), and should better be modelled by materially valid inference. While a classical logician could add a ceteris paribus clause to 1. to make it usable in formally valid inferences:

1. "If I rub this match along the striking surface, then, ceteris paribus, (Note: literally: "all other things being equal"; here: "assuming a typical situation") it will inflame."

However, Brandom doubts that the meaning of such a clause can be made explicit, and prefers to consider it as a hint to non-monotony rather than a miracle drug to establish monotony.

Moreover, the "match" example shows that a typical everyday inference can hardly be ever made formally complete. In a similar way, Lewis Carroll's dialogue "What the Tortoise Said to Achilles" demonstrates that the attempt to make every inference fully complete can lead to an infinite regression.

== See also ==
Material inference should not be confused with the following concepts, which refer to formal, not material validity:

- Material conditional — the logical connective "→" (i.e. "formally implies")
- Material implication (rule of inference) — a rule for formally replacing "→" by "¬" (negation) and "∨" (disjunction)
