= Scarcity (social psychology) =

Concept in social psychology

Scarcity as a concept in social psychology operates much like scarcity in the area of economics. Scarcity is basically how people handle satisfying themselves regarding unlimited wants and needs with resources that are limited. Humans place a higher value on an object that is scarce, and a lower value on those that are in abundance. For example diamonds are more valuable than rocks because diamonds are not as abundant. These perceptions of scarcity can lead to irregular consumer behavior, such as systemic errors or cognitive bias.

There are two social psychology principles that work with scarcity that increase its powerful force. One is social proof. This is a contributing factor to the effectiveness of scarcity because if a product is sold out, or inventory is extremely low, humans interpret that to mean the product must be good since everyone else appears to be buying it. The second contributing principle to scarcity is commitment. If someone has already committed themselves to something, and then finds out they cannot have it, it makes the person want the item more.

Although people usually think of scarcity in a physical manner, the 'product' in short supply can also be abstract ideas such as time or energy.

== Examples ==
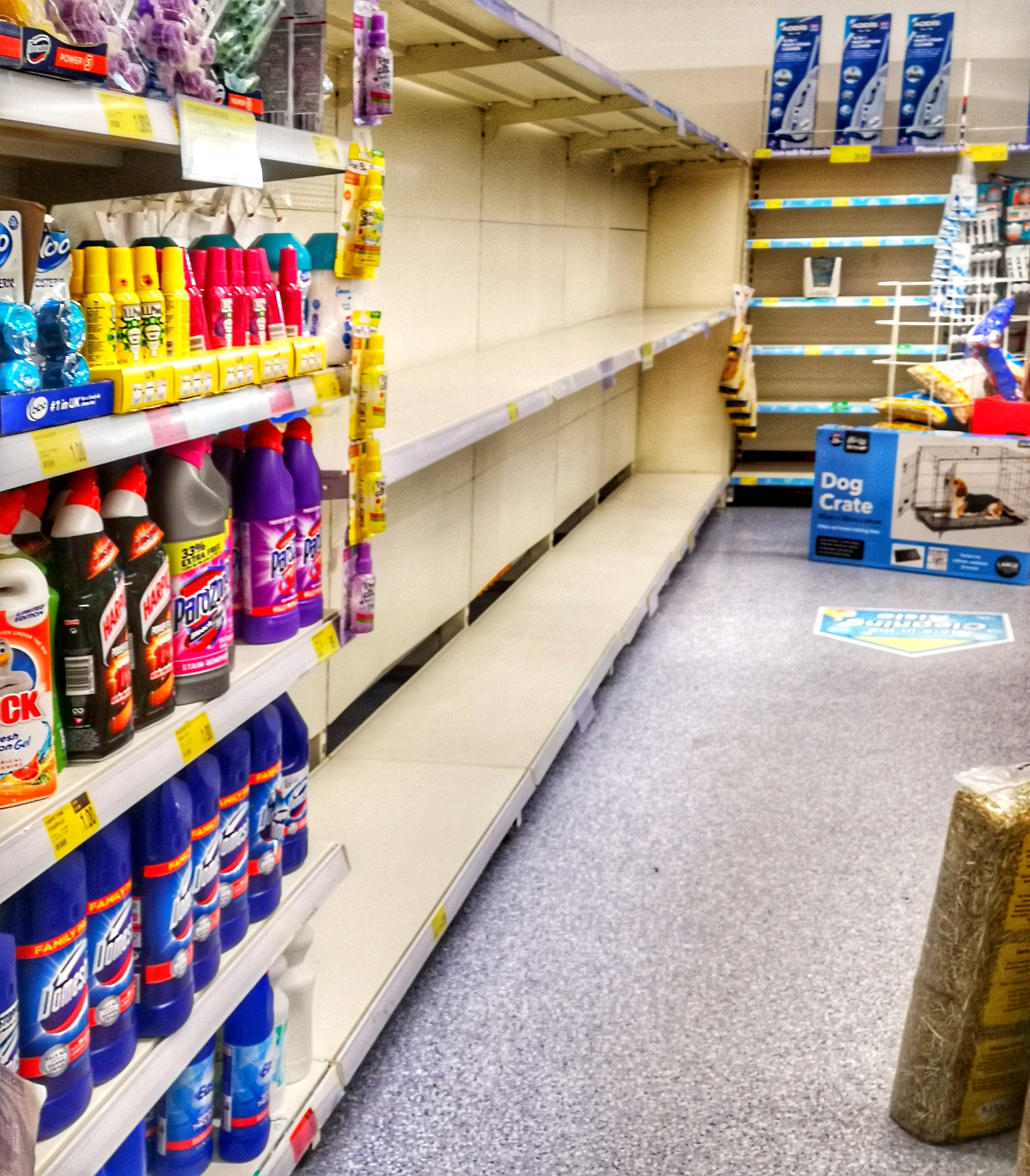
There are no toilet rolls on the shelves in March 2020.

This idea is embedded in the "Black Friday" shopping experience that many United States consumers participate in every year on the day after Thanksgiving. More than getting a lower price on a great gift, shoppers want the competition of obtaining the product.

Another example of the effects of scarcity is the phenomenon of panic buying, which drives people to display hoarding behaviors when faced with the possibility of going without a certain product. Historically, panic buying was seen during the COVID-19 pandemic in 2020. Due to the pandemic, people panic bought toilet paper out of fear of limited product supply, creating a shortage.

Scarcity can affect the minds of consumers. The spontaneous, limited release of "Busch Apple" is a modern-day example of scarcity. In the summer of 2020, Anheuser-Busch unveiled a new, limited-edition beer; Busch Apple (Busch Light Apple). The limited release prompted consumers to purchase it in higher quantities due to its limited supply and high demand. Additional evidence of this is in 2021 when Busch Apple returned to stores, where over one million cases were sold in the United States. This, of course, is due to the item being scarce, having the ability to cause one’s brain to perceive the item at a higher value.

Scarcity of time can be a less-visible and highly pervasive psychological phenomenon that can affect everyday decisions. People who constantly feel pressed for time report higher levels of stress when making everyday decisions and less satisfaction with life overall.

== Effects of scarcity in humans ==
Scarcity of resources can create frustration due to the inability to obtain the coveted item.

=== Hoarding ===
Scarcity is also considered by some to encourage hoarding behavior. Researchers have found that when consumers are faced with perceived scarcity, they may become overwhelmed by the fear of needing an item and not having it. This can lead to unnecessary buying and hoarding of items that are already in short supply. This in turn creates a cycle of scarcity in which people are so afraid of going without a needed item, they buy all they are able, thus furthering the actual scarcity of the item.

=== Impulse buying ===
Impulse buying can also be a side effect of perceived scarcity. When people are faced with the possibility of having to go without an item, they often times will buy it, with no regard to whether or not it is actually needed. This, similarly to hoarding, often stems from a sense of urgency that develops when an item is perceived to be scarce.

=== Lack of Empathy ===
A study on perceived scarcity of time in subjects known as The Good Samaritan study illustrated that when people are feeling pressed for time, they have less empathy for people around them in need. This study has been repeated in various ways and has consistently demonstrated that people on average are less willing to help others when they believe time is scarce.

== Heuristics ==
Heuristics are basically mental shortcuts to be able to make judgement calls quickly. We use heuristics to speed up our decision-making process when an exhaustive, deliberative process is perceived to be impractical or unnecessary. Thus heuristics are simple, efficient rules, which have developed through either evolutionary proclivities or past learning. While these "rules" work well in most circumstances, there are certain situations where they can lead to systemic errors or cognitive bias.

According to Robert Cialdini, the scarcity heuristic leads us to make biased decisions on a daily basis. It is particularly common to be biased by the scarcity heuristic when assessing quantity, rarity, and time.

=== Quantity ===
The simplest manifestation of the scarcity heuristic is the fear of losing access to some resource resulting from the possession of a small or diminishing quantity of the asset. For example, your favorite shirt becomes more valuable when you know you cannot replace it. If you had ten shirts of the same style and color, losing one would likely be less distressful because you have several others to take its place.

=== Rarity ===
Objects can increase in value if they have unique properties, or are exceptionally difficult to replicate. Collectors of rare baseball cards or stamps are simple examples of the principle of rarity.

=== Time ===
When faced with a short amount of time, the decision may be rushed and made in haste, leaving room for error in decision making.

== Studies ==
Numerous studies have been conducted on the topic of scarcity in social psychology:

- Scarcity rhetoric in a job advertisement for restaurant server positions has been investigated. Subjects were presented with two help-wanted ads, one of which suggested numerous job vacancies, while the other suggested that very few were available. The study found that subjects who were presented with the advertisement that suggested limited positions available viewed the company as being a better one to work for than the one that implied many job positions were available. Subjects also felt that the advertisement that suggested limited vacancies translated to higher wages. In short, subjects placed a positive, higher value on the company that suggested that there were scarce job vacancies available.
- Another study examined how the scarcity of men may lead women to seek high-paying careers and to delay starting a family. This effect was driven by how the sex ratio altered the mating market, not just the job market. Sex ratios involving a scarcity of men led women to seek lucrative careers because of the difficulty women have in finding an investing, long-term mate under such circumstances.

== Conditional variations ==
Although the scarcity heuristic can always affect judgment and perception, certain situations exacerbate the effect. New scarcity and competition are common cases.

=== New scarcity ===
New scarcity occurs when our irrational desire for limited resources increases when we move from a state of abundance to a state of scarcity. This is in line with psychological reactance theory, which states that a person will react strongly when they perceive that their options are likely to be lessened in the future.

Worchel, Lee & Adewole (1975) demonstrated this principle with a simple experiment. They divided people into two groups, giving one group a jar of ten cookies and another a jar with only two cookies. When asked to rate the quality of the cookie the group with two, in line with the scarcity heuristic, found the cookies more desirable. The researchers then added a new element. Some participants were first given a jar of ten cookies, but before participants could sample the cookie, experimenters removed 8 cookies so that there were again only two. The group first having ten but then were reduced to two, rated the cookies more desirable than both of the other groups.

=== Competition ===
In situations when others are directly competing for scarce resources, the value we assign to objects is further inflated. Advertisers commonly take advantage of scarcity heuristics by marketing products as "hot items" or by telling customers that certain goods will sell out quickly.

In 1983, Coleco Industries marketed a soft-sculpted doll that had exaggerated neonatal features and came with "adoption papers". Demand for these dolls exceeded expectations, and spot shortages began to occur shortly after their introduction to the market. This scarcity fueled demand even more and created what became known as the Cabbage Patch panic (Langway, Hughey, McAlevey, Wang, & Conant, 1983). Customers scratched, choked, pushed, and fought one another in an attempt to get the dolls. Several stores were wrecked during these riots, so many stores began requiring people to wait in line (for as long as 14 hours) in order to obtain one of the dolls. A secondary market quickly developed where sellers were receiving up to $150 per doll. Even at these prices, the dolls were so difficult to obtain that one Kansas City postman flew to London to get one for his daughter (Adler et al., 1983).

— Lynn (1992)

== Effects of scarcity in animals ==
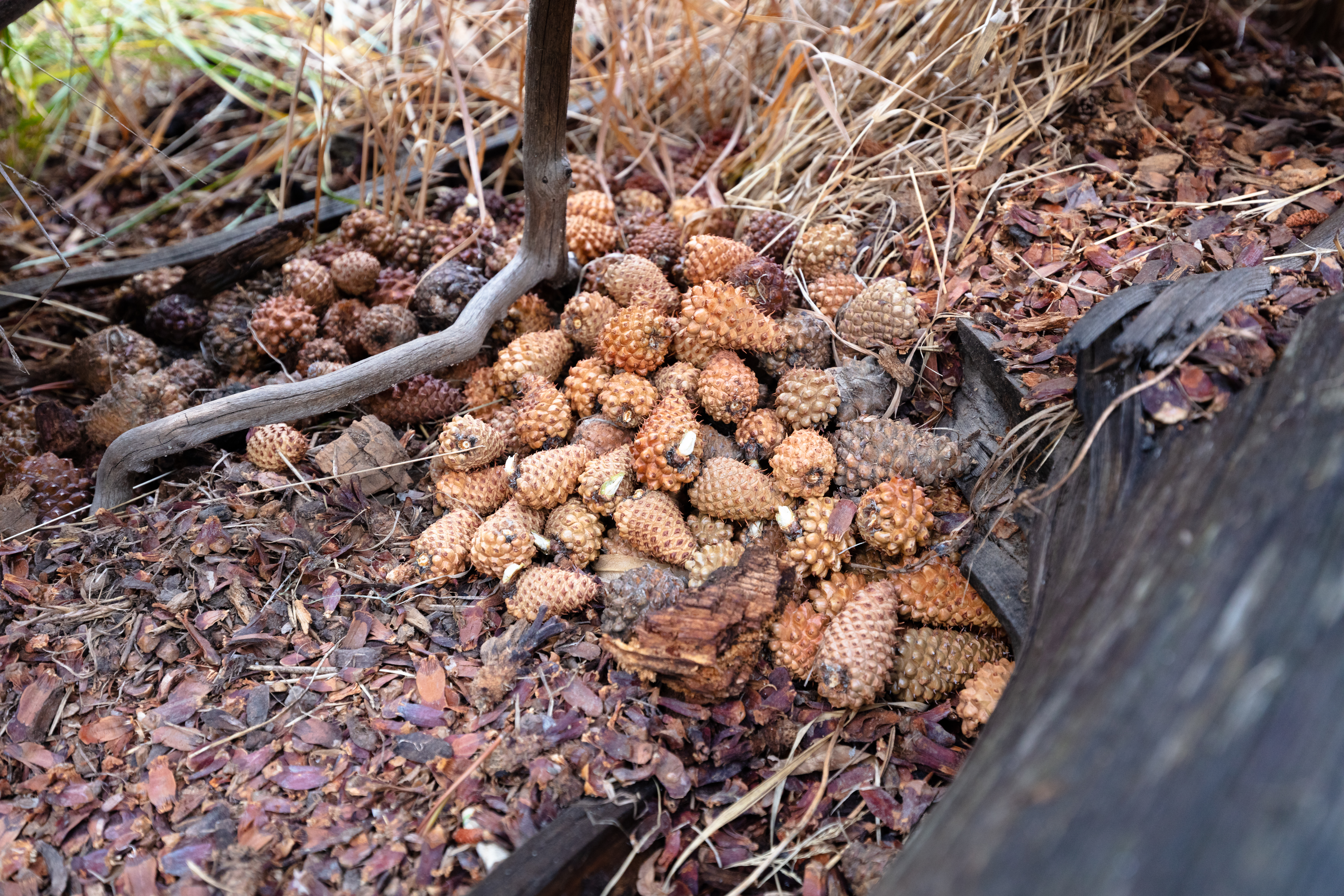
Red squirrel hoarding food to store

Scarcity is not only seen in humans. It can also be seen in the behavior of animals. In fact, one example of scarcity in animals is water. Livestock animals have bodies that are more than half water in volume. The smaller and indigenous animals are more tolerant due to their size. The smaller animals require less water and are better able to survive in areas where water is scarce.

Hoarding is also found in some species of birds and even rodents. This hoarding is typically food. The birds and rodents commonly store up food and hide it in a place that is out of reach for other animals.

== Scarcity mentality ==
The frontal lobe, the biggest lobe of the brain, controls the decision making of the person.

Scarcity can be more than a physical limitation. It also involves the frontal lobe in the brain, which is in charge of making decisions. It can also affect how people think and feel. When there are not enough resources, whether financial or time, challenges are created for the human cognitive system. This presents problems such as impulsive behavior which likely impairs performance. These people also exhibit lowered intellectual abilities and more forgetful behaviors. With these impairments and deficits, performance is actually lowered and that causes behaviors that actually worsen the effects of scarcity.

== See also ==
- Artificial scarcity
- Fear of missing out
- Principle of least interest

== Bibliography ==
- Cialdini, Robert B. (2001) [1984]. Influence: Science and Practice (4th ed.). Boston: Allyn and Bacon. ISBN 978-0-321-01147-3.
- Gigerenzer, Gerd (1991). "How to Make Cognitive Illusions Disappear: Beyond "Heuristics and Biases"" (PDF). European Review of Social Psychology. 2: 83–115. CiteSeerX 10.1.1.336.9826. doi:10.1080/14792779143000033.
- Lynn, Michael (1989). "Scarcity effects on desirability: Mediated by assumed expensiveness?". Journal of Economic Psychology. 10 (2): 257–274. doi:10.1016/0167-4870(89)90023-8. hdl:1813/72078. Archived from the original on June 16, 2014.
- Lynn, Michael (1992). "The Psychology of Unavailability: Explaining Scarcity and Cost Effects on Value". Basic and Applied Social Psychology. 13 (1): 3–7. doi:10.1207/s15324834basp1301_2. hdl:1813/71653. Archived from the original on March 10, 2014.
- Mittone, Luigi; Savadori, Lucia (2009). "The Scarcity Bias". Applied Psychology. 58 (3): 453–468. doi:10.1111/j.1464-0597.2009.00401.x.
- Pearl, Judea (1985). Heuristics: Intelligent search strategies for computer problem solving (Repr. with corr. ed.). Reading, Mass.: Addison-Wesley Pub. Co. p. vii. ISBN 978-0-201-05594-8.
- Worchel, Stephen; Arnold, Susan; Baker, Michael (1975). "The Effects of Censorship on Attitude Change: The Influence of Censor and Communication Characteristics" (PDF). Journal of Applied Social Psychology. 5 (3): 227–239. doi:10.1111/j.1559-1816.1975.tb00678.x. Archived from the original on 2015-02-23.
- Worchel, Stephen; Lee, Jerry; Adewole, Akanbi (1975). "Effects of supply and demand on ratings of object value". Journal of Personality and Social Psychology. 32 (5): 906–914. doi:10.1037/0022-3514.32.5.906.
- Zellinger, David A.; Fromkin, Howard L.; Speller, Donald E.; Kohn, Carol A. (1975). "A commodity theory analysis of the effects of age restrictions upon pornographic materials". Journal of Applied Psychology. 60 (1): 94–99. doi:10.1037/h0076350.
