= Constant bearing, decreasing range =

Term in navigation

Diagram showing principle of constant bearing, decreasing range in marine collision avoidance. When an observer sees another vessel at a constant bearing and the range continually decreases, collision is imminent.

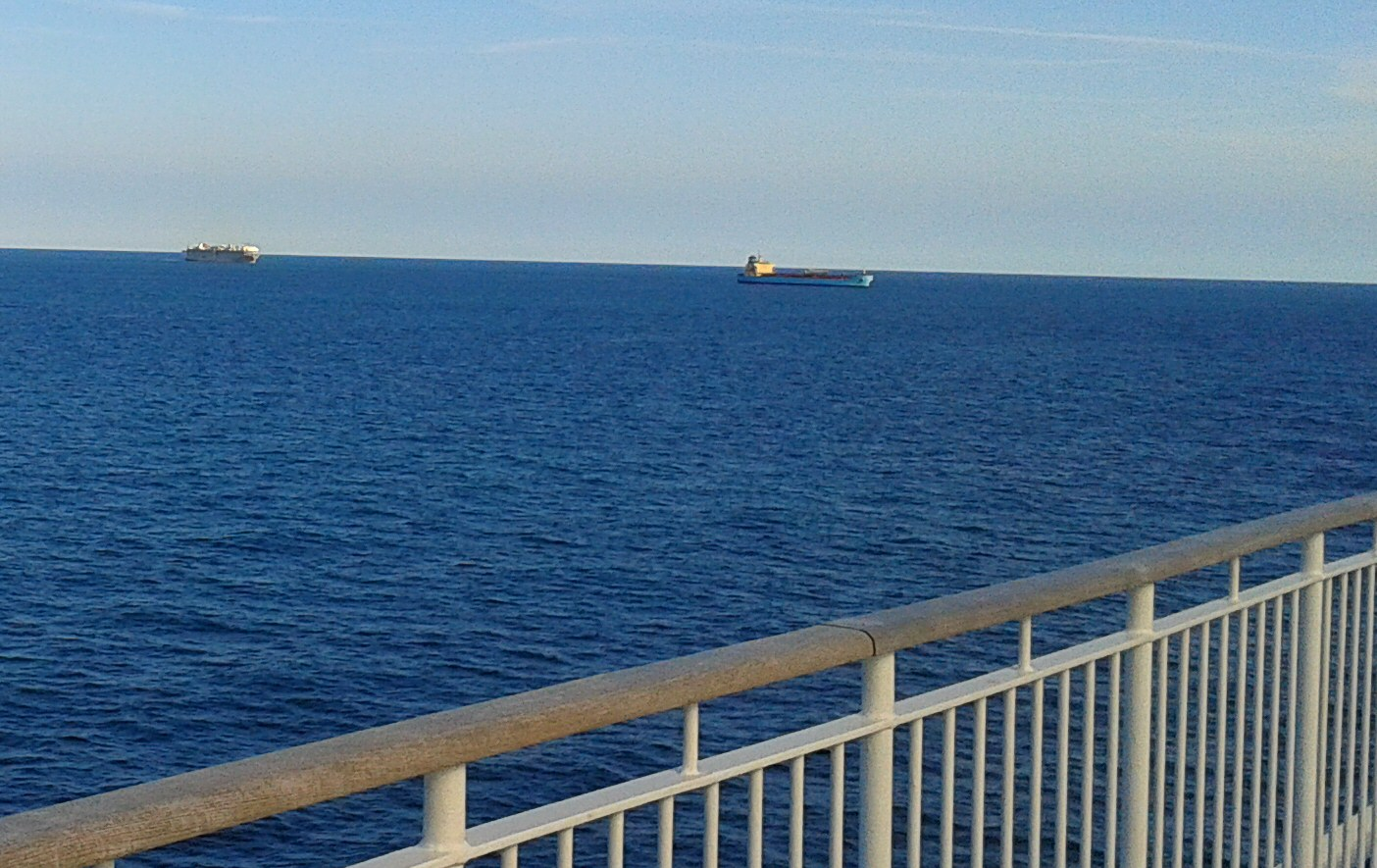
A ship seen to be on a constant bearing with decreasing range will collide with the observer's ship unless avoiding action is taken.

Constant bearing, decreasing range (CBDR) is a term in navigation which means that some object, usually another ship viewed from the deck or bridge of one's own ship, is getting closer but maintaining the same absolute bearing. If this continues, the objects will collide.

== Risk ==
Sailors, especially deck hands and those who stand watch on the bridge, are trained to watch for this situation and make it known when they detect it happening. The reasoning is subtle: non-sailors who are used to driving automobiles normally are able to detect the possible risk of a collision with implicit reference to the background (e.g., the street, the scenery, the landscape, etc.) At sea, when vessels are borne in water, the sea surface removes this vital visual clue. Unaware individuals tend to gauge the risk of two vessels colliding based on which direction each vessel is heading. In other words, a novice will think that two vessels which appear to be heading apart from each other cannot collide. This is false, as when a faster vessel is overtaking a slower one, they can in fact have a collision even though the vessels are on substantially different headings.

On a river, CBDR is less useful, as it is likely that both the observed and the observing vessel will follow curving courses along the waterway, whether or not they are on a collision course. In such situations safe navigation depends on upstream and downstream traffic keeping to separate sectors of the navigable channel.

== Visual clues ==
When a non-moving background (typically the shoreline) is present, CBDR situations can usually be recognized by observing that some part of the moving target vessel is not visually moving against the background. On the other hand, if the target vessel visually moves forward against the background, with relative bearing decreasing, then the target vessel will pass in front of the observing vessel and there is no risk of collision, provided both vessels maintain constant speed and course. Similarly, if the target vessel visually moves backward against the background, with relative bearing increasing, the target vessel will pass behind the observing vessel. However, this method of recognizing non-CBDR conditions is only accurate for relatively small observing vessels. With larger vessels, only an observer positioned near the bow can reliably make the first conclusion, whereas the second conclusion can only be left to an observer positioned near the stern.

When objects are on a collision course, they can appear stationary to each other. This is particularly hazardous in aviation. Human vision is drawn to motion, so the conditions for mid-air collision can be difficult to detect by eye. An incoming plane can appear as a small motionless speck for a while, then suddenly bloom into a large mass when it is likely too late to avoid. This is called the blossom effect.

== Relative bearing ==
Another source of confusion arises from the distinction between relative bearing and absolute bearing. One might think that another vessel which seems to be progressing from, perhaps, dead ahead to apparent movement down one's starboard side cannot result in a collision. This is not quite true. Because a vessel afloat can change its true heading (relative to north) without obvious detection (unless there are landmarks in sight) two vessels may collide even if one presents a substantially changing relative bearing.

== Road safety ==
The phenomenon also presents itself in road safety. At the crossing of two straight roads, a CBDR condition may occur and keep one vehicle in the other's blind spot. Even without blind spots, the lack of optic flow makes for harder spotting.

== See also ==
- Gaze heuristic
- Motion camouflage
- Proportional navigation
