= Gaze heuristic =

To catch it, a fielder moves to keep a constant angle of gaze on the ball

The gaze heuristic falls under the category of tracking heuristics, and it is used in directing correct motion to achieve a goal using one main variable. McLeod & Dienes' (1996) example of the gaze heuristic is catching a ball.

Gerd Gigerenzer categorizes the gaze heuristic under tracking heuristics, where human animals and non-human animals are able to process large amounts of information quickly and react, regardless of whether the information is consciously processed.

The gaze heuristic is a critical element in animal behavior, being used in predation heavily. At the most basic level, the gaze heuristic ignores all casual relevant variables to make quick gut reactions.

== Example ==
A catcher using the gaze heuristic observes the initial angle of the ball and runs towards it in such a way as to keep this angle constant. The gaze heuristic does not require knowledge of any of the variables required by the optimizing approach, nor does it require the catcher to integrate information, yet it allows the catcher to catch the ball. The gaze heuristic may therefore be described at ecologically rational at least in the simple case of catching a ball in the air.

== See also ==
- Constant bearing, decreasing range
