= Österreichische Universitätenkonferenz =

Austrian advocacy organisation

Universities Austria
- Formation: 1911
- Headquarters: Vienna, Austria (European Union)
- Members: 22 federal universities
- President: Brigitte Hütter
- Website: uniko.ac.at

Universities Austria (German: Österreichische Universitätenkonferenz, uniko) is an advocacy organisation that supports research universities in Austria and promotes science, art, and research. It was founded in 1911. In 2008, it changed its name from Österreichische Rektorenkonferenz (Austrian Rectors' Conference) to Österreichische Universitätenkonferenz.

Members are all federal universities in accordance with the Austrian Universities Act 2002, which are represented in the plenary assembly by their rectors. The president since October 2024 is Brigitte Hütter, rector of the University of Art and Design Linz, following Oliver Vitouch in this capacity. The secretary general is Elisabeth Fiorioli.

== History ==
The first meeting took place in Vienna in 1911. From the start of the University Organization Act 1975 until the end of December 2003, when the Universitäts-Organisationsgesetz 1993 (1993 University Organization Act) was superseded by the Universitätsgesetz 2002 (Austrian Universities Act 2002), the Rectors' Conference was a federal institution with partial legal capacity (Teilrechtsfähigkeit).

In addition to the internal coordination of Austria's federal universities, uniko represents the concerns of universities in national and international affairs and in the public, and is a member of the European University Association. The association signed the Berlin Declaration on Open Access to Knowledge in the Sciences and Humanities in November 2004.

== Officials ==
The following rectors have served as chairmen and presidents of the association:

- Ludwig Adamovich (Universität Wien), 1945–1947
- Johann Sölch (Universität Wien), 1947/48
- Wolfgang Denk (Universität Wien), 1948/49
- Richard Meister (Universität Wien), 1949/50
- Johannes Gabriel (Universität Wien), 1950/51
- Alfred Verdross-Drossberg (Universität Wien), 1951/52
- Wilhelm Czermak (Universität Wien), 1952-1953
- Alfred Verdross-Drossberg (Universität Wien), 1953
- Leopold Schönbauer (Universität Wien), 1953/54
- Johann Radon (Universität Wien), 1954/55
- Carl Johann Jellouschek (Universität Wien), 1955/56
- Johann Schima (Universität Wien), 1956/57
- Erich Schenk (Universität Wien), 1957/58
- Erwin Schneider (Universität Wien), 1958/59
- Tassilo Antoine (Universität Wien), 1959/60
- Othmar Kühn (Universität Wien), 1960/61
- Franz Arnold (Universität Wien), 1961/62
- Roland Grassberger (Universität Wien), 1962/63
- Albin Lesky (Universität Wien), 1963/64
- Karl Fellinger (Universität Wien), 1964/65
- Nikolaus Hofreiter (Universität Wien), 1965/66
- Karl Hörmann (Universität Wien), 1966/67
- Fritz Schwind (Universität Wien), 1967/68
- Walther Kraus (Universität Wien), 1968/69
- Fritz Zerbst (Universität Wien), 1969/70
- Richard Biebl (Universität Wien), 1970/71
- Alexander Dordett (Universität Wien), 1971/72
- Günther Winkler (Universität Wien), 1972/73
- Siegfried Korninger (Universität Wien), 1973–1975
- Franz Seitelberger (Universität Wien), 1975–1977
- Kurt Komarek (Universität Wien), 1977–1979
- Manfried Welan (Universität für Bodenkultur Wien), 1979–1981
- Richard Georg Plaschka (Universität Wien), 1981–1983
- Hans Tuppy (Universität Wien), 1983–1985
- Walter Kemmerling (Technische Universität Wien), 1985–1987
- Christian Brünner (Universität Graz), 1987–1989
- Werner Biffl (Universität für Bodenkultur Wien), 1989–1991
- Alfred Ebenbauer (Universität Wien), 1991–1993
- Johannes Hengstschläger (Universität Linz), 1993–1995
- Peter Skalicky (Technische Universität Wien), 1995–1999
- Wolf Rauch (Universität Graz), April to December 1999
- Georg Winckler (Universität Wien), 2000–2005
- Christoph Badelt (Wirtschaftsuniversität Wien), 2005–2009
- Hans Sünkel (Technische Universität Graz), 2010–2011
- Heinrich Schmidinger (Universität Salzburg), 2011–2015
- Sonja Hammerschmid (Veterinärmedizinische Universität Wien), January to May 2016
- Oliver Vitouch (Universität Klagenfurt), 2016–2017
- Eva Blimlinger (Akademie der bildenden Künste Wien), 2018–2019
- Oliver Vitouch (Universität Klagenfurt), July to December 2019
- Sabine Seidler (Technische Universität Wien), 2020–2023
- Oliver Vitouch (Universität Klagenfurt), 2023–2024
- Brigitte Hütter (Universität für künstlerische und industrielle Gestaltung Linz), 2024–

== See also ==
- List of universities in Austria
- Rektorenkonferenz der Schweizer Universitäten, Switzerland
- Hochschulrektorenkonferenz (German Rectors' Conference)
- Österreichische Fachhochschul-Konferenz
- Open access in Austria
