= Oliver Vitouch =

Austrian psychologist and cognitive scientist (born 1971)

Rector of the University of Klagenfurt
- In office 29 October 2012 – 28 October 2024
- Preceded by: Heinrich C. Mayr
- Succeeded by: Ada Pellert

President of Universities Austria
- In office 6 June 2016 – 31 December 2017
- Preceded by: Sonja Hammerschmid
- Succeeded by: Eva Blimlinger
- In office 1 July 2019 – 31 December 2019
- Preceded by: Eva Blimlinger
- Succeeded by: Sabine Seidler
- In office 1 October 2023 – 28 October 2024
- Preceded by: Sabine Seidler
- Succeeded by: Brigitte Hütter

Vice-President of Universities Austria
- In office 1 January 2016 – 30 September 2023
- Preceded by: Gerald Bast
- Succeeded by: Brigitte Hütter & Markus Müller

Personal details
- Born: 4 April 1971 (age 55) Vienna
- Citizenship: Austrian
- Spouse: Judith Glück
- Children: Jonas, Lena
- Education: University of Vienna
- Scientific career
- Fields: Cognition
- Workplaces: University of Vienna; Max Planck Institute for Human Development; University of Klagenfurt
- Website: https://www.aau.at

Oliver Vitouch (born 4 April 1971 in Vienna) is an Austrian psychologist and cognitive scientist. He served as Rector of the University of Klagenfurt from 2012 to 2024, and as President and Vice-President, respectively, of Universities Austria from 2016 to 2024.

== Academic biography ==
Vitouch attended high school at the Akademisches Gymnasium Vienna from 1981 to 1989, and studied music at the Vienna Conservatory from 1986 to 1992. At the University of Vienna, he studied psychology (with a focus on human biology and cognitive neuroscience), receiving a Master of Science degree in 1995 and a Doctor of Science in 1999. He was a pre-doctoral assistant at the University of Vienna from 1995, and a research scientist at Gerd Gigerenzer's Center for Adaptive Behavior and Cognition (ABC) at the Max Planck Institute for Human Development in Berlin from 2000 to 2002, and taught at the Free University of Berlin and the University of St. Gallen. After his habilitation in psychology, he became associate professor at the University of Vienna in 2002 and was appointed full professor of Cognitive Psychology at the University of Klagenfurt in 2003.

Vitouch's scholarly work spans the fields of cognitive psychology, experimental psychology, research methodology, philosophy of science, evolutionary psychology, and cognitive neuroscience, with a particular focus on judgment and decision-making and the psychology of music. His work is characterized by an interdisciplinary and multi-method approach. His Erdős number is 5. Before taking office as rector (2012), Vitouch had served as a reviewer for approximately 40 academic journals, funding programs, and publishers. Invited guest lectures took him to Amsterdam, Berlin, Bochum, Cambridge, Lausanne, Leipzig, Ljubljana, Mannheim, Salzburg, Vienna, Warsaw, Zurich, et al.

== Presidencies ==
From 2005 to 2006, Vitouch was head of the Department of Psychology, and from 2006 to 2012, Chairman of the University's Senate (re-elected thrice). He served as Member of the Board (2004–2006) and President (2008–2010) of the Austrian Psychological Association. In this capacity, he contributed significantly to the implementation of university admission laws (Art. 124b, now Art. 71c, of the Austrian Universities Act) in consequence of the 2005 judgement of the European Court of Justice decreeing open access to Austrian universities also for German students.

Oliver Vitouch took office as Rector of the University of Klagenfurt in October 2012. He was re-elected for a second four-year term (2016–2020) in May 2015, and for a third term (2020–2024) in May 2019. During his presidency, the University of Klagenfurt achieved rank 48 in the Times Higher Education (THE) Young University Rankings (2021), was second only to the University of Vienna among Austrian general universities in THE's World University Rankings (2020 and 2021, rank 301–350), won two Global Student Satisfaction Awards en suite from Studyportals (2021 and 2023, in cooperation with the British Council), and was included in the Prix Versailles' World's Most Beautiful Campuses list (2023, under UNESCO patronage).

From January 2015 to May 2016, Vitouch was in charge as President of the Alps-Adriatic Rectors’ Conference (AARC), a society founded 1979 in Graz with currently 49 member universities from Austria, Southern Germany, Hungary, Upper Italy, Slovenia, Croatia, Bosnia and Herzegovina, Serbia, and Albania. His successor in this role was Dragan Marušič. Since January 2016, he served as Vice-President and from June 2016 to December 2017 as President (after Sonja Hammerschmid's change into federal government) of Universities Austria, the association of Austria's 22 federal research universities. He was chiefly involved into the enactment of Austria’s new system of university funding (Art. 141 to 141c and 71a to 71d of the Austrian Universities Act). Not running for another term as President, he was active as Vice-President again since January 2018, and served as Acting President in the second half of 2019. With the end of Sabine Seidler's term, he once more assumed the role of Acting President in October 2023, and was unanimously elected President again two months later.

On 9 June 2016 a group of identitarians invaded a lecture on inclusion at the University of Klagenfurt. Aiming to keep hold of the squad leader until the police arrives, Vitouch was punched in the stomach. The offender was convicted of aggravated assault on 12 July 2019 by the criminal court in Graz.

As Vice-President of Universities Austria, Vitouch was significantly involved into the emergence of the initiative Universities for Enlightenment (U4E), sustained by the Rectors' Conferences of Austria, Croatia, the Czech Republic, Germany, Italy, Poland, Serbia, Switzerland, Slovakia, and Slovenia. This was triggered by the expulsion of the Central European University by the Hungarian government, the governmental reorganization of Hungarian Universities, and the government/university conflicts in Poland and the Czech Republic. The ten Rectors' Conferences signed the "Vienna Statement" in December 2018.

Due to the course of the COVID-19 pandemic, Vitouch announced in early November 2021 that the University of Klagenfurt will be requiring COVID vaccination for all community members who partake in on-campus activities. At the Global Student Satisfaction Awards 2021, provided by Studyportals, the University of Klagenfurt had come off as global winner for the best COVID-19 Crisis Management.

In January 2022, Vitouch ran for rector of the University of Vienna for the four-year term starting with October 2022. The process was accompanied by the executive search firm Egon Zehnder. Vitouch was shortlisted by the search committee and, after public hearings, by the university's Senate. On April 30, the Board of Trustees decided for Sebastian Schütze, an art historian and incumbent dean of the university.

Vitouch's third term as rector of the University of Klagenfurt ended in October 2024, when he resumed his duties as a full professor. He spent November/December 2025 as a Visiting Researcher at the University of Cambridge. In June 2026, he served as a peer reviewer for the German Rectors' Conference in the Internationalization of Universities audit of Heidelberg University. For the term from July 2026 to June 2031, Vitouch was appointed by the Federal Government of Austria to the Board of Trustees of the Institute of Science and Technology Austria (ISTA), a research institute established in 2009 and modeled after ETH Zurich, the Max Planck Society, and the Weizmann Institute of Science.

== Media activities ==
From November 2017 to January 2020, Vitouch wrote for the column Außensicht (German for "outer view") of Kleine Zeitung, Austria's largest regional daily. Earlier, he had sporadically contributed to the op-ed page (Kommentar der anderen) of Der Standard since 1996. His main topics were higher education, science, and Enlightenment.

== Selected bibliography ==
- Vitouch, O., & Glück, J. (1997). "Small group PETting:" Sample sizes in brain mapping research. Human Brain Mapping, 5, 74–77.
- (2001). When your ear sets the stage: Musical context effects in film perception. Psychology of Music, 29, 70–83.
- Neumeister, A., Konstantinidis, A., Stastny, J., Schwarz, M. J., Vitouch, O., Willeit, M., Praschak-Rieder, N., Zach, J., de Zwaan, M., Bondy, B., Ackenheil, M., & Kasper, S. (2002). Association between serotonin transporter gene promoter polymorphism (5HTTLPR) and behavioral responses to tryptophan depletion in healthy women with and without family history of depression. Archives of General Psychiatry, 59, 613–620.
- (2003). Absolutist models of absolute pitch are absolutely misleading. Music Perception, 21, 111–117.
- Gigerenzer, G., Krauss, S., & Vitouch, O. (2004). The null ritual: What you always wanted to know about significance testing but were afraid to ask. In D. Kaplan (Ed.), The SAGE handbook of quantitative methodology for the social sciences (pp. 391–408). Thousand Oaks, CA: Sage.
- Hanoch, Y., & Vitouch, O. (2004). When less is more: Information, emotional arousal and the ecological reframing of the Yerkes-Dodson law. Theory & Psychology, 14, 427–452.
- (2006). The musical mind: Neural tuning and the aesthetic experience. In P. B. Baltes, P. Reuter-Lorenz & F. Rösler (Eds.), Lifespan development and the brain: The perspective of biocultural co-constructivism (pp. 217–236). New York: Cambridge University Press.
- Vitouch, O., & Ladinig, O. (Eds.) (2009). Music and evolution. Musicae Scientiae, 13 (Special Issue 2009–2010, 445 pp.).
- Marewski, J., Pohl, R., & Vitouch, O. (Eds.) (2010/11). Recognition processes in inferential decision making (I–III). Special Issue, Judgment and Decision Making, 5 (4), 6 (1) & 6 (5).
- Marewski, J., Pohl, R., & Vitouch, O. (2011). Recognition-based judgments and decisions: What we have learned (so far). Judgment and Decision Making, 6, 359–380.
- Martignon, L., Vitouch, O., Takezawa, M., & Forster, M. R. (2011). Naive and yet enlightened: From natural frequencies to fast and frugal decision trees. In G. Gigerenzer, R. Hertwig & T. Pachur (Eds.), Heuristics: The foundations of adaptive behavior (pp. 136–150). New York: Oxford University Press.
- Koreimann, S., Gula, B., & Vitouch, O. (2014). Inattentional deafness in music. Psychological Research, 78, 304–312.
- Kause, A., Vitouch, O., & Glück, J. (2018). How selfish is a thirsty man? A pilot study on comparing sharing behavior with primary and secondary rewards. PLOS One, 13 (8), e0201358.
