= Matthias Vereno =

Austrian theologian (1922–2009)

Swami Matthias Vereno
- Church: Catholic Church
- Archdiocese: Archdiocese of Salzburg (incardinated)

Orders
- Ordination: 29 June 1977

Personal details
- Born: Karl Feldl; 5 October 1922 Düsseldorf
- Died: 30 May 2009 (aged 86) Aspach, Upper Austria, Austria
- Spouse: Gertrud (died 1975)
- Children: 3 =
- Education: University of Vienna; University of Freiburg; University of Tübingen

Matthias Vereno (5 October 1922 – 30 May 2009) was a German-Austrian theologian, priest, and swami.

== Early life, marriage, academic career ==
His parents were Eugen and Maria (née Kavcic) from Vienna, but Vereno was born in Düsseldorf. The name given him at birth was Karl Feldl. He attended high school in Vienna-Döbling and Berlin-Steglitz, graduated in 1940, entered military service in 1941, served in North Africa, and was incarcerated until 1946. He then studied philosophy, history, art history, theater, religious studies and theology at the universities of Vienna, Freiburg, and Tübingen, where he received his Ph.D. in 1953; his doctoral advisor was Helmuth von Glasenapp.

He was a speak at the Salzburg Hochschulwochen in 1955 and remained in the city. He worked as a freelance writer and served as a Catholic religious instructor at a training school for young women in Salzburg in the school year 1955/56. Additionally, he was editor of the journal Kairos, devoted to religious studies, from 1959 to 1968. The journal was published by Otto Müller Verlag from 1959 to 1995. The editorial offices were in the Salzburg Edmundsburg. It published articles by Titus Burckhardt and Adolf Holl, among others.

Vereno received the Habilitation at the University of Salzburg in 1968 and taught there from 1969 to 1977; he was also a visiting professor at the University of California, Santa Barbara and the University of Madras (India) from 1968 to 1971. In addition, Vereno had lectureships at in theology and Christian culture at the Salzburg branch of the University of Portland in Oregon (run by the Holy Cross Fathers); from 1975 to 1977.

== Entry at St. Peter's Archabbey, Salzburg ==
Vereno raised three sons together with his wife Gertrud. After her death in 1975, he decided to become a Benedictine. He was clothed a few days after his ordination to the priesthood (the ordination was on 29 June 1977) in the Archabbey of St. Peter and then took vows as a regular oblate.

Vereno made a pilgrimage to Nigeria from September 1982 to Easter 1983. He left the monastery the following September and was incardinated in the Archdiocese of Salzburg.

== Swami ==
Vereno traveled to India with an Indian Sister of the Good Shepherd in October 1986 to discover new ways of spirituality. This was followed by attempts to found religious communities in Italy and various other places. His last place of residence was in Aspach, Upper Austria, where he died on 5 June 2009. During this period of his life he called himself Swami, according to Indian tradition. He was a vegetarian and didn't smoke or drink alcohol. His former disciple and longtime companion was Swami Samipata.

== Selected publications ==
- Die Lebensweiheit Ostasiens. [The Life Wisdom of East Asia]. 1960.
- Worte der Ferne: Gedichte. [Words of the Far East: Poems]. 1948.
- Einweihung und spirituelle Nachfolge. [Initiation and Spiritual Discipleship]. 1965.
- Religionen des Ostens: Weisheit und Glauben alter Kulturvölker. [Religions of the East: Wisdom and Beliefs of Ancient Cultures]. 1960.
- Mythisches Wissen und Offenbarung. [Mythical knowledge and revelation]. 1958.
- Zeichen der Zeit: die Herausforderung des christlichen Bewußtseins in der gegenwärtigen Weltsituation. [Signs of the times: the challenge of Christian consciousness in the present world situation].
- Das Wort in den Worten: christliche Überlieferung in unserer Weltstunde. [The word in words: Christian tradition in our time]. 2016.
- Menschheitsüberlieferung und Heilsgeschichte: zum Verständnis der geistigen Begegnung zwischen Asien und dem Abendland [Human tradition and history of salvation: understanding the spiritual encounter between Asia and the Occident]. 1960.
- Buddhismus; Lehre und Geschichte [Vereno translated with Zita Fränzen]. 1962.
