= University of Klagenfurt =

Federal research university in Klagenfurt, Austria

- Alpen-Adria-Universität Klagenfurt
- Motto: Per Aspera Ad Astra (Latin)
- Motto in English: Through hardships to the stars
- Type: Public research university
- Established: 1970 / 1975 / 1993
- Affiliations: AACSB, YERUN
- Budget: €95 million (2025)
- Rector: Ada Pellert
- Academic staff: 1,195 (2023)
- Total staff: 1,698 (2023)
- Students: 13,323 (2024/25)
- Doctoral students: 471 (2021/22)
- Location: Klagenfurt, Austria; 46°36′59″N 14°15′54″E
- Campus: Suburban, 27 acres (11 ha)
- Colors: Shades of Blue
- Website: www.aau.at

The University of Klagenfurt (German: Universität Klagenfurt or Alpen-Adria-Universität Klagenfurt, AAU) is a federal Austrian research university and the largest research and higher education institution in the state of Carinthia. It has its campus in Klagenfurt.

Originally founded in 1970 and relaunched in 1993, the university today holds faculties of arts, humanities & education, management, economics & law, social sciences, and technical sciences. It is listed in the THE and QS global rankings and held rank 48 worldwide in THE's Young University Rankings 2021.

The university has defined three research priority areas, Social Ecology (until 2018, transferred to BOKU Vienna), Networked and Autonomous Systems, and Multiple Perspectives in Optimization, with the former spawning three ERC Grants and the latter a doc.funds programme of the Austrian Science Fund. It has launched a new initiative, Humans in the Digital Age (HDA), in 2019, hosting an ERC Grant on cybersecurity.

It also holds a number of central facilities such as the Robert Musil Institute (co-organizer of the Bachmann Prize), the Karl Popper Kolleg (an Institute for Advanced Study), the University Cultural Centre (UNIKUM), the build! Gründerzentrum (a start-up facilitation center), the University Sports Centre (USI), and the Klagenfurt University Library.

Since Dec 1, 2024, the university's rector is Ada Pellert, former rector of the University of Hagen, following Oliver Vitouch in this capacity. Ulrike Krieg-Holz chairs the Academic Senate; Werner Wutscher is chairman of the University Council.

The University of Klagenfurt is situated 30 km from the Slovenian and 60 km from the Italian border and supports bi- and multilingualism, especially in the context of the Slovenian minority in Carinthia. Together with the Free University of Bozen-Bolzano (Italy) and the University of Fribourg (Switzerland), it is among the three southernmost universities in the German-speaking world.

== History ==
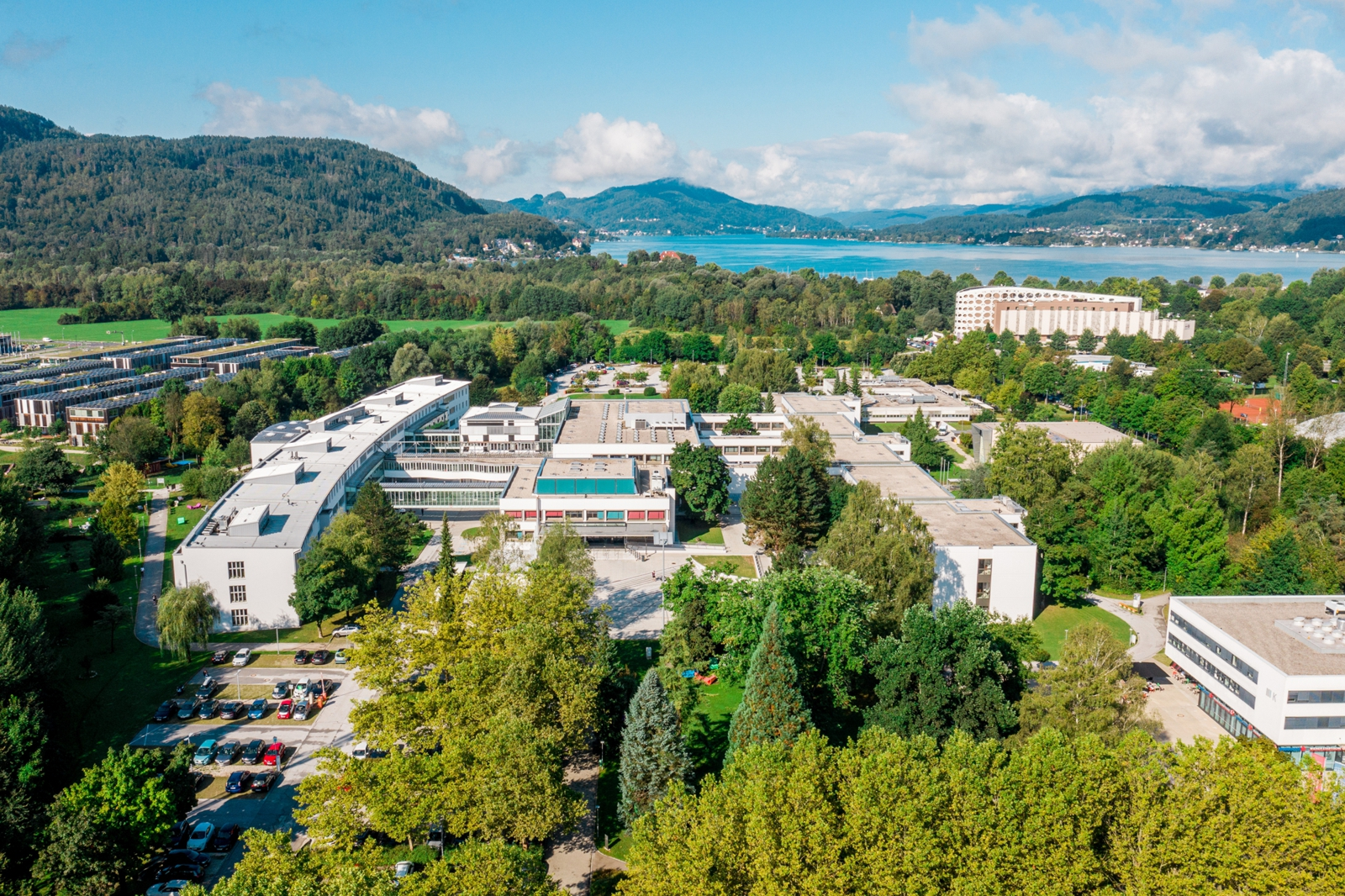
The University of Klagenfurt and the adjacent Lakeside Science & Technology Park (2019)

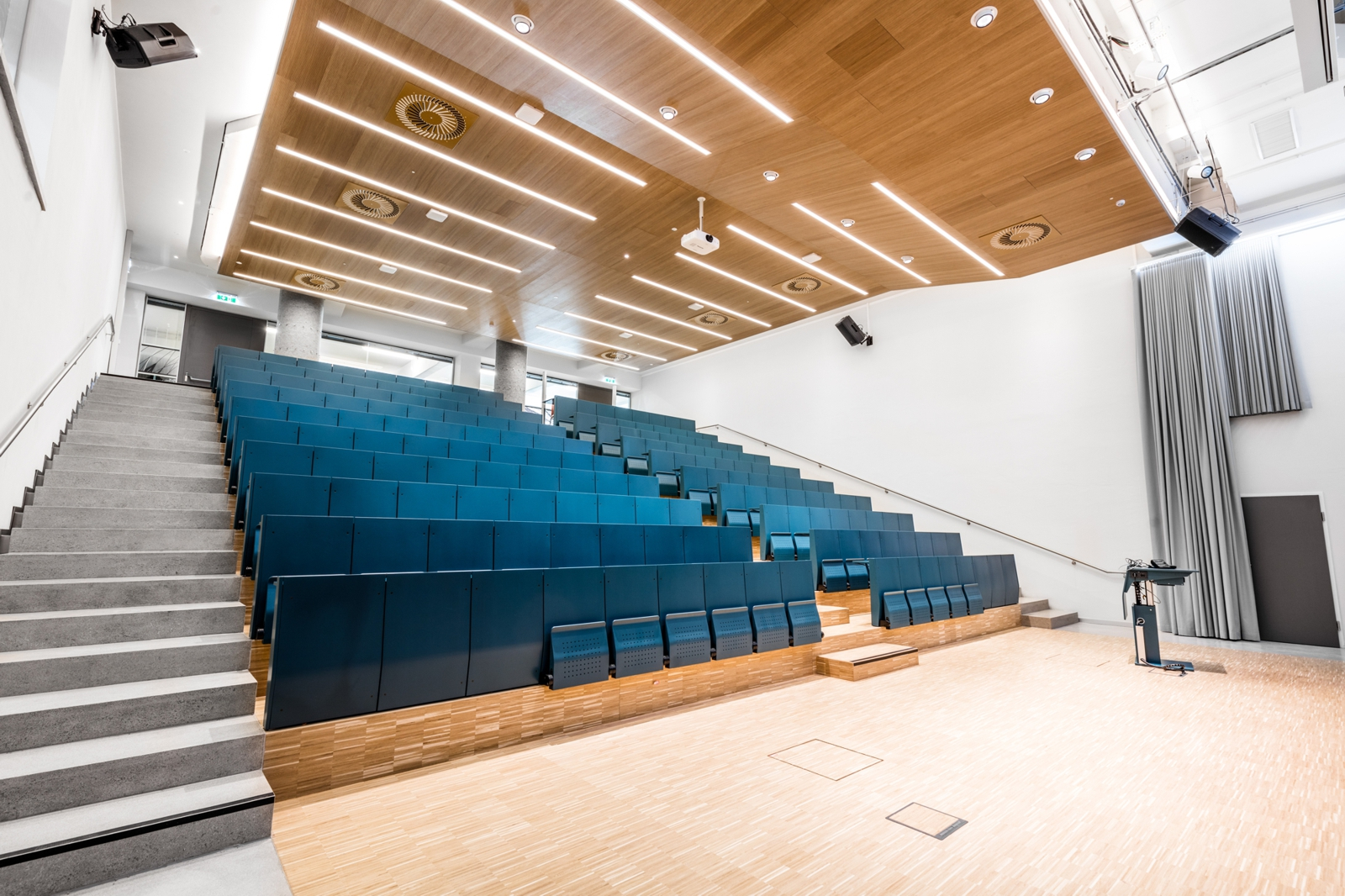
Lecture Hall 1 (Central Wing)

With the Protestant collegium sapientiae et pietatis founded in 1552, Klagenfurt hosted one of the oldest gymnasiums in Austria (today's Europagymnasium), directed by Hieronymus Megiser from 1593 to 1601, but had no ancient university tradition.

In 1970, the Austrian parliament passed a federal law allowing the establishment of an Educational Science College in Klagenfurt. The first doctoral degree was conferred in 1972. In 1975, new laws on higher education came into force, with the name of the college being changed into Universität für Bildungswissenschaften (University of Educational Sciences).

In 1993, a fundamental relaunch took place: The institution's name was changed to Universität Klagenfurt (University of Klagenfurt), and a Faculty of Humanities and a (new) Faculty of Economics, Business Administration, and Informatics were inaugurated. The Faculty of Interdisciplinary Studies was inaugurated in 2004.

The university adopted the official cognomen Alpen-Adria-Universität Klagenfurt in 2004 (with its legal name still being Universität Klagenfurt). It was extended with a fourth, technical sciences faculty in 2007 (with a focus on Informatics, Information Technology, and Networked & Autonomous Systems), engaging in research operations in collaboration with the Lakeside Science & Technology Park. In 2012, the number of students passed the 10,000 mark.

On occasion of the institution's 40th anniversary, a Boat Race was held on Lake Wörth in 2010. Klagenfurt's Eight won against the University of Vienna by a boat length on a sprinting distance from the rowing clubs to Maria Loretto castle.

In 2015, the university established commencement speeches at its graduation ceremonies. Among the speakers so far are Sabine Herlitschka, Josef Winkler, August-Wilhelm Scheer, Johanna Rachinger, Josef Aschbacher, Judith Kohlenberger, and Christoph Grabenwarter. Presidents of Austria Heinz Fischer (formerly) and Alexander Van der Bellen (incumbent) are recurrent guests at doctoral graduations sub auspiciis Praesidentis.

In 2020, the university celebrated its institutional 50 year jubilee. This included a lecture series together with the Austrian Academy of Sciences, Utopia! Is the world out of joint? Contributions to the art of Enlightenment opened by Barbara Stollberg-Rilinger and the bestowal of an honorary doctorate to Rae Langton. Several further jubilee events were virtualized or postponed due to the COVID-19 pandemic. On 22 November 2020 the Austrian Broadcasting Corporation showed the TV documentary Humans in the Digital Age: University of Klagenfurt—50th Anniversary.

The jubilee exhibition ARTEFICIA was postponed to autumn 2021. It shows unique exhibits from honorary doctors Manfred Bockelmann, Michael Guttenbrunner, Maja Haderlap, Peter Handke, Maria Lassnig, Valentin Oman, Wolfgang Puschnig, Peter Turrini, and Josef Winkler.

Technological developments of the University of Klagenfurt—leading contributions to the navigation system of the robotic helicopter Ingenuity—are part of NASAs Mars 2020 mission (Mars landing on 18 February 2021, maiden flight of the helicopter on 19 April 2021).

== Campus ==
With its suburban setting, the university campus is in walking distance of both the renaissance-dominated historic city centre of Klagenfurt (capital of the state of Carinthia) and the east bay of the Wörthersee, a renowned Austrian summer resort. Also hiking, climbing and skiing possibilities in the Austrian Alps are nearby.

Together with the adjacent Lakeside Science & Technology Park, a 60 acres start-up and spin-off park, the university campus forms the so-called Lakeside District. The Park hosts companies such as ASFINAG, CISC Semiconductor, Dynatrace, Fraunhofer Austria, Infineon, Joanneum Research, Kapsch TrafficCom, PharmTElligent, and SKIDATA.

From 2016 to 2018, the university's central and north wing (13,000 m^{2}) were fully refurbished with a budget of €26 million. As a result, the university was shortlisted for the Prix Versailles – Campuses 2019 (under UNESCO patronage), together with buildings of the University of Chicago in Hongkong, Barnard College, Stanford University, SPA Vijayawada, and Skoltech, which won the competition. It is listed among the World’s Most Beautiful Campuses since 2023.

== Faculties and departments ==
The following four-faculty structure does apply since 1 January 2023.

=== Faculty of Arts, Humanities & Education ===
The Faculty of Arts, Humanities & Education encompasses 11 departments and a faculty centre. Their common ambition is to foster multilingualism and intercultural education, with a special focus on teacher education.

- Department of English and American Studies
- Department of Cultural Analysis
- Department of Educational Sciences and Research
- Department of German Studies
- Department of History
- Department of Instructional and School Development
- Department of Philosophy
- Department of Romance Studies
- Department of Slavonic Studies
- Department of Sports Science
- Robert Musil Institute for Literary Studies
- Faculty Centre for Sign Language and Communication of the Hearing Impaired

=== Faculty of Management, Economics & Law ===
The Faculty of Management, Economics & Law has a focus on business management while fostering interdisciplinary links with law and economics. Alumni shall be fit for global business careers in the 21st century. Since February 2023, the Faculty is AACSB accredited.

- Department of Business Management
- Department of Economics
- Department of Financial Management
- Department of Innovation Management and Entrepreneurship
- Department of Operations, Energy, and Environmental Management
- Department of Organization, Human Resources, and Service Management
- Department of Public, Nonprofit, and Health Management
- Department of Law

=== Faculty of Social Sciences ===
This faculty focuses on many of the core disciplines of the Social Sciences, including two of the university's most demanded curricula. The faculty maintains a strategic partnership with the Austrian Academy of Sciences.

- Department of Geography and Regional Studies
- Department of Media and Communications Science
- Department of Psychology
- Department of Society, Knowledge and Politics

=== Faculty of Technical Sciences ===
The Faculty of Technical Sciences is dedicated to research and training in the fields of informatics, information technology and technical mathematics. The faculty was founded in January 2007 and superseded the Faculty of Economics, Business Administration and Informatics as well as a newly established Department for information and communication technology. It is organized into nine departments and offers five bachelor's degree programs, four master's degree programs, two teacher training degree programs and two doctoral programs.

- Department of Artificial Intelligence and Cybersecurity
- Department of Informatics Education
- Department of Informatics Systems
- Department of Information Technology
- Department of Mathematics
- Department of Mathematics Education
- Department of Networked and Embedded Systems
- Department of Smart Systems Technologies
- Department of Statistics

The research cluster "self-organizing networked systems" closely collaborates with the research institute Lakeside Labs.

== University centres ==
- Centre for Women's and Gender Studies
- Digital Age Research Centre (D^{!}ARC)
- Karl Popper Kolleg
- M/O/T – School of Management, Organizational Development and Technology
- School of Education (SoE)
- UNIKUM (University Cultural Centre)

== Partnerships ==
As of 2021, the University of Klagenfurt has strategic partnerships with the Austrian Academy of Sciences, the Ca' Foscari University of Venice, the Fraunhofer Austria Society, and with Silicon Austria Labs (SAL). It offers joint study programs with the Universities of Vienna, Graz, Udine, La Rochelle, and the Poznań University of Technology.

Student mobility partnerships via Erasmus+ and other exchange programs exist with over 250 universities in more than 50 countries worldwide.

At the beginning of 2022, the University of Klagenfurt joined YERUN, a European network of young research-intensive universities headquartered in Brussels.

== Rankings ==
University rankings

Global – Overall
- QS World: =697 (2026)
- THE World: 601–800 (2026)

Global – Business and economics
- THE Business and Economics: 301–400 (2025)

Global – Life sciences and medicine
- THE Psychology: 301–400 (2025)

Global – Science and engineering
- THE Computer Science: 201–250 (2025)

The THE World University Rankings 2026 list the University of Klagenfurt in the 601–800 group, on par with Graz University of Technology. THE uses the field-weighted citation impact, considering the different range of fields between universities.

From the STEM fields, the University of Klagenfurt has technology, engineering, and mathematics in its spectrum, but not any classic sciences or life sciences, which is a handicap in the other large global university rankings. Still, it holds rank 697 in the QS World University Rankings, which aim to rank the 1,500 best universities in the world (out of > 26,000).

The University of Klagenfurt also ranked in the Academic Ranking of World Universities (Shanghai Ranking) from 2019 to 2022 (801–900/901–1,000), and in U-Multirank since 2017 (honorable mention in 2021).

In the biennial Global Student Satisfaction Awards 2021, provided by Studyportals, the University of Klagenfurt came off as global winner for the best ″COVID-19 Crisis Management″. In 2023, it won again in the ″Student Diversity″ category. This makes it a double winner in student satisfaction worldwide.

== Honorary doctors ==
- Hans Albert (2007)
- Manfred Bockelmann (2013)
- Joseph Buttinger (1977)
- Karl Corino (2014)
- Peter Eichhorn (2003)
- Helmut Engelbrecht (1998)
- Hertha Firnberg (1980)
- Adolf Frisé (1982)
- Gerda Fröhlich (1995)
- Manfred Max Gehring (1992)
- Ernst von Glasersfeld (1997)
- Georg Gottlob (2016)
- Michael Guttenbrunner (1994)
- Maja Haderlap (2012)
- Peter Handke (2002)
- Adolf Holl (2000)
- Johannes Huber (2017)
- Sigmund Kripp (1998)
- Rae Langton (2020)
- Maria Lassnig (1999 / 2013)
- Florjan Lipuš (2022)
- Claudio Magris (1995)
- Käte Meyer-Drawe (2022)
- Ewald Nowotny (2008)
- Valentin Oman (1995)
- Paul Parin (1995)
- Wolfgang Petritsch (2013)
- Theodor Piffl-Perčević (1977)
- Janko Pleterski (2005)
- Wolfgang Puschnig (2004)
- Josef Rattner (2006)
- Siegfried J. Schmidt (2004)
- Carola-Bibiane Schönlieb (2022)
- Franz Schuh (2022)
- Klaus Tschira (1995)
- Peter Turrini (2010)
- Oswald Wiener (1995)
- Horst Wildemann (2003)
- Josef Winkler (2009)
