= Loprieno =

Loprieno is a surname. Notable people with the surname include:

- Antonio Loprieno (born 1955), Swiss Italian Egyptologist
- John Loprieno (born 1960), American actor and writer
