= Isabel Dziobek =

German psychologist and psychotherapist

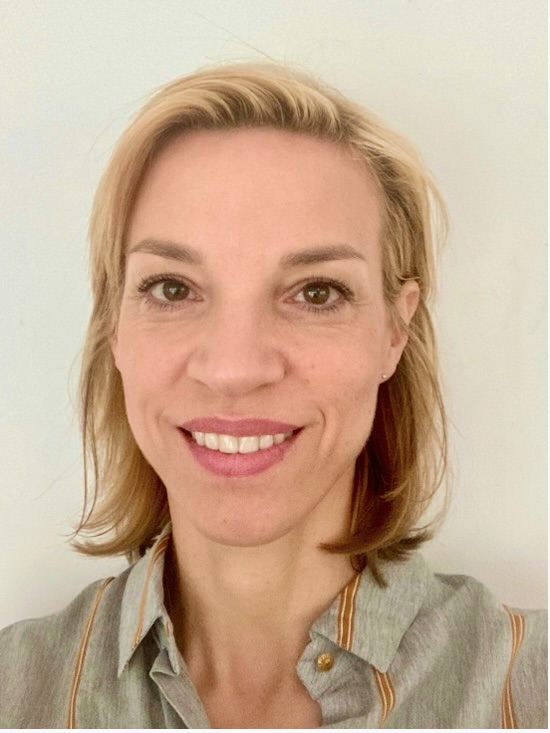
- Citizenship: German
- Known for: Autism Research
- Awards: Charlotte- und Karl-Bühler Preis, Ulrike-Fritze-Lindenthal-Antistigma-Preis
- Scientific career
- Fields: Clinical Psychology, Social Cognition, Clinical Neuroscience, Autism Research
- Workplaces: Humboldt-University of Berlin, Deutsches Zentrum für Psychische Gesundheit (DZPG)
- Website: https://dziobek-lab.org/ https://www.psychology.hu-berlin.de/en/staff/1687995?set_language=en

Isabel Dziobek is a German psychologist, psychotherapist (cognitive behavioral therapy) and a social-cognitive neuroscientist. She is a professor of Clinical Psychology of Social Interaction at the Department of Psychology at Humboldt University of Berlin. Dziobek's work focuses on the research and treatment of social interaction disorders, particularly those related to the autism spectrum.

== Career ==
After studying psychology at Ruhr University Bochum, Dziobek completed her doctoral research at the New York University School of Medicine, Center for Brain Health, and earned her PhD in 2006 at Bielefeld University on social cognition and neural correlates of autism spectrum disorders.

She subsequently worked as a postdoctoral researcher at the Max Planck Institute for Human Development in Berlin and led the junior research group 'Understanding Interaffectivity' within the Cluster of Excellence 'Languages of Emotion' at Free University of Berlin. Dziobek completed her habilitation at Free University of Berlin in and became a licensed psychological psychotherapist (cognitive behavioral therapy) in 2015.

In 2014, she took up the professorship for Social Cognition at the Berlin School of Mind and Brain, Humboldt University of Berlin. Since 2018, she has been Professor of Clinical Psychology of Social Interaction at the Department of Psychology, and since 2022, director of the outpatient clinic for psychotherapy and psychodiagnostics.

== Research and work ==
Dziobek's research focuses on bio-psycho-social mechanisms of social interaction disorders (autism, social anxiety disorders, personality disorders), neurobiological correlates of socio-emotional processes, and the development and evaluation of diagnostic and intervention tools in the field of social interaction and socio-emotional competence (individual and group CBT), movement interventions, and e-mental health. She also studies altered states of consciousness through meditation and high-ventilation breathwork. She serves on the scientific advisory board of the MIND Foundation.

She is particularly interested in patient and public involvement (PPI) in mental health research. Since 2023, she has led the Center for PPI at the German Center for Mental Health (DZPG) and, since May 2025, she is the spokesperson for DZPG at the Berlin/Potsdam site.

Her primary research interest since her PhD has been autism spectrum specificity. In 2008, she co-founded the Scientific Society Autism Spectrum (WGAS) with Sven Bölte and also established the participatory Autism Research Cooperation (AFK). In 2016, the group received the Ulrike Fritze-Lindenthal Anti-Stigma Award from the German Society for Psychiatry and Psychotherapy, Psychosomatics and Neurology for their work. In 2014, she was awarded the Charlotte and Karl Bühler Prize by the German Psychological Society.

== Selected publications ==
- Bayer, M., Johnstone, T., & Dziobek, I. (2023). It's who, not what that matters: Personal relevance and early face processing. Social Cognitive and Affective Neuroscience, 18(1), Article nsad021. https://doi.org/10.1093/scan/nsad021
- Naumann, S., Bayer, M., Kirst, S., van der Meer, E., & Dziobek, I. (2023). A randomized controlled trial on the digital socio-emotional competence training Zirkus Empathico for prescholers. npj Science of Learning, 8(1), Article 20. https://doi.org/10.1038/s41539-023-00169-8
- Drimalla, H., Scheffer, T., Landwehr, N., Baskow, I., Roepke, S., Behnia, B., & Dziobek, I. (2022). Author Correction: Towards the automatic detection of social biomarkers in autism spectrum disorder: Introducing the simulated interaction task (SIT). npj Digital Medicine, 5(1), Article 20. https://doi.org/10.1038/s41746-022-00563-3
- Kirst, S., Diehm, R., Bögl, K., Wilde-Etzold, S., Bach, C., Noterdaeme, M., Poustka, L., Ziegler, M., & Dziobek, I. (2022). Fostering socio-emotional competencies in children on the autism spectrum using a parent-assisted serious game: A multicenter randomized controlled trial. Behaviour Research and Therapy, 152, Article 104068. https://doi.org/10.1016/j.brat.2022.104068
- Plank, I. S., Hindi Attar, C., Kunas, S. L., Bermpohl, F., & Dziobek, I. (2022). Increased child-evoked activation in the precuneus during facial affect recognition in mothers. Human Brain Mapping, 43(9), 2911–2922. https://doi.org/10.1002/hbm.25825

== Media presence (selection) ==
Dziobek’s work has been discussed in German national media, including public broadcasters such as ARD, ZDF, WDR, Deutschlandfunk and ARTE, particularly in the context of autism diagnosis, psychotherapy and neurodiversity.

- Anders vernetzt: Autismus. 37 Grad Leben – Die Einzeldokus. ZDF, 31 August 2025.
- Mit Autismus an die Uni: Warum große Veränderungen eine Herausforderung sind. SWR Wissen, YouTube, 2 April 2025.
- Neurodiversität – Wie normal ist anders? ARD Wissen, Bayerischer Rundfunk, 11 April 2025.
- Autismus-Diagnose mit 35 – Hannah und ihr neues Leben. Quarks, WDR, 20 December 2024.
- Anders im Kopf – Neurodiversität als Stärke. Wissen hoch 2, 3sat, 7 November 2024.
- Superkraft Empathie: So kannst du sie trainieren. Terra Xplore, ZDF, 3 September 2023.
- Ich, autistisch Psycho. ARTE, 2023.
