= Paul Baltes =

German psychologist (1936–2006)

Paul B. Baltes (18 June 1939 – 7 November 2006) was a German developmental psychologist who researched life-span development and aging. He is credited with developing theories about lifespan-development, successful aging, and wisdom, and the "selective optimization with compensation theory" of compensating decline in aging by focussing on strengths. He has been described by American Psychologist as one of the most influential developmental psychologists.

== Biography ==
Paul B. Baltes was born in Saarlouis, Germany. He is credited with developing theories about lifespan and wisdom, the selective optimization with compensation theory, and theories about successful aging and developing. He received his doctorate from the University of Saarbrücken (Saarland, Germany) in 1967. After, Baltes spent 12 years at several American institutions as a professor of psychology and human development before returning to Germany in 1980. He was Director of the Center of Lifespan Psychology at the Max Planck Institute for Human Development, Berlin, Professor of Psychology at the Free University of Berlin, and Distinguished Professor of Psychology at the University of Virginia. At the Max Planck Institute for Human Development he founded the Berlin Wisdom Project and became a leader in the scientific study of wisdom. Baltes later became the director of the Max Planck International Research Network on Aging.

He was a founding member of the European Academy of Sciences, a member of the Berlin-Brandenburg Academy of Sciences, and a member and vice-president of the Deutsche Akademie der Naturforscher Leopoldina. Paul Baltes also became a member of the Order Pour le mérite for scientists and artists and a foreign member of the American Academy of Arts and Sciences and the Royal Swedish Academy of Sciences.

As to research and theory, Baltes was interested in advancing a life-span view of human ontogenesis that considers behavioral and cognitive functioning from childhood into old age using a family of perspectives that together specify a coherent metatheoretical view on the nature of development. Other substantive topics included work on historical cohort effects, cognitive development, a dual-process conception of lifespan intelligence, and the study of wisdom. His interests also included models of successful development and the cross-cultural comparative study of self-related agency beliefs in the context of child development and school performance. Together with his late wife, Margret Baltes, he proposed a systemic metatheory of ontogeny which characterizes lifespan development as the orchestration of three processes: selection, optimization, and compensation.

Baltes was active in various national and international organizations including the US Social Science Research Council (where he served as chair of the Board of Directors from 1996 until 2000), the German-American Academy Council, the Berlin-Brandenburg Academy of Sciences, and the European Academy of Science. Regarding interdisciplinarity, Baltes was engaged primarily in two projects: he chaired (together with Karl Ulrich Mayer) the Berlin Aging Study and, together with the Sociologist Neil Smelser, he was co-editor-in-chief of the 26-volume International Encyclopedia of the Social and Behavioral Sciences (Elsevier) which appeared in 2001.

Baltes was the author or editor of 18 books and more than 250 scholarly articles and chapters. For his work, he was honored with numerous awards including honorary doctorates and election as foreign member of the American Academy of Arts and Sciences and the Royal Swedish Academy of Sciences, and in 2000 to the German order Pour le mérite of Science and the Arts.

He died at home in Berlin of pancreatic cancer in 2006.

== Life-Span Developmental Psychology ==
=== Overview ===
Life-span psychology can be defined as the exploration of biological, cognitive, and psychosocial changes and constancies that occur throughout the course of life. It has been presented as a theoretical perspective, proposing several fundamental, theoretical, and methodological principles about the nature of human development. An attempt by researchers has been made to examine whether research on the nature of development suggests a specific metatheoretical worldview. Several beliefs, taken together, form the “family of perspectives” that contribute to this particular view. Baltes argues there are seven key features which affect human development across the life span, namely: (1) development occurs across one's entire life, (2) multidirectionality and multidimensionality, (3) development as growth and decline, (4) the role plasticity plays in development, (5) the influence of socio-cultural condition on development, (6) the interactions of age-graded, history-graded, and nonnormative historical influences on development, and (7) the multidisciplinary nature of human development.

=== Lifelong Development ===
Lifelong development involves the idea that development is not completed in adulthood; it encompasses the entire life span, from conception to death. The study of development traditionally focused almost exclusively on the changes occurring from conception to adolescence and the gradual decline in old age. It was believed that the five or six decades after adolescence yielded little to no developmental change at all. The current view reflects the possibility that specific changes in development can occur later in life, without having been established at birth. The early events of one's childhood can be transformed by later events in one's life. This belief clearly emphasizes that all stages of the life span equally contribute in the regulation of the nature of human development; no age period holds supremacy over another. Many diverse patterns of change such as direction, timing, and order can vary among individuals and affect the ways in which they develop. As individuals move through life, they are faced with many challenges, opportunities, and situations that “give direction, force, and substance to their development”.

=== Multidimensionality and Multidirectionality ===
Baltes states that multidimensionality and multidirectionality are characteristics of human development. By multidimensionality, Baltes is referring to the fact that a complex interplay of factors, both endogenous and exogenous, influence development across the lifespan. Baltes argues that a dynamic interaction of these factors is what influences an individual's development. As a result, certain factors may have a more powerful effect on a particular domain than another factor. Regardless, Baltes stresses that not one single criterion determines the development of a domain. The second part of the proposition referring to multidirectionality, Baltes states that the development of a particular domain does not occur in a strictly linear fashion that increases towards functional efficacy of a particular modality. A concept fundamental to multidirectionality is the changes between fluid and crystallized intelligence. Crystallized intelligence involves the pragmatics of intelligence, that is what knowledge and context are related in being able to apply the mechanics of intelligence (fluid). The fluid "mechanics" of intelligence refers to the brain's basic architecture in problem solving and information processing. Baltes created his model of Multidrectional and Multidimensional intelligence (see 1987 article, p. 615) to describe this concept utilizing crystallized and fluid intelligence which he credits as having been the most developed research across the entire lifespan. Rather development can be characterized as having the capacity for both an increase and decrease in efficacy over the course of an individual's life. As a result, the development of various domains is multidirectional in nature.

The developmental process occurring between childhood and adolescence known as puberty illustrates Baltes’ principle of multidimensionality and multidirectionality. Puberty is described as a period of “rapid morphological body changes; including physical growth and hormonal changes, as well as a myriad psychological and social contextual changes.” The types of morphological changes associated with puberty include the development of primary and secondary sex characteristics, alterations in height and weight, fluctuations in hormonal levels, along with several other changes. Psychological changes during adolescence involve a broad range of experiences individuals encounter over this period of dynamic changes; including the development of advanced cognitive faculties such as abstraction and other adult cognitive processes, new emotions, along with other psychosocial changes. The fact that the term puberty encompasses such a broad range of domains illustrates the multidimensionality component of the overarching concept. The concept of puberty is also multidirectional as individual domains may both improve or decline in levels of effectiveness. Self-regulation is one domain of puberty which undergoes profound multidirectional changes during the adolescent period. During childhood, individuals have difficulty effectively regulating their actions and impulsive behaviors. Scholars have noted that this lack of effective regulation often results in children engaging in behaviors without fully considering the consequences of one's actions. Over the course of puberty, neuronal changes attempt to deal with this unregulated behavior by increasing one's ability to regulate emotions and impulses. Inversely, the ability for adolescents to engage in spontaneous activity and creativity, both domains commonly associated with impulse behavior, decreases over the adolescent period in response to changes in cognition. In the end, neuronal changes to the limbic system and prefrontal cortex which are associated with puberty lead to the development of self-regulation, and the ability to consider the consequences of one's actions.

=== Development as Gain/Loss ===
Baltes argues development across the lifespan is influenced by the “joint expression of features of growth (gain) and decline (loss).” Extending on the premise of multidirectionality, this principle argues for the existence of a parallel process of development that is composed of both gains and losses. Baltes argues that factors which contribute to gain or loss are not in equal proportions but adjust according to systematic age-related shifts. The result of this gain/loss relationship is that an individual's development occurs within the framework of this dynamic relationship. This relation between developmental gains and losses occurs in a direction to selectively optimize particular capacities which requires the sacrificing of other functions, a process known as selective optimization with compensation. According to the process of selective optimization, individuals over the life-span prioritize particular functions above others, reducing the adaptive capacity of particulars for specialization and improved efficacy of other modalities.

The acquisition of effective self-regulation in adolescents illustrates the gain/loss paradigm put forth by Baltes. As adolescents gain the ability to effectively regulate their actions, they may be forced to sacrifice features to selectively optimize their reactions. For example, individuals may sacrifice their capacity to be spontaneous or creative, if they are constantly required to make thoughtful decisions and regulate their emotions. Adolescents may also be forced to sacrifice their reaction times toward processing stimuli in favour being able to fully consider the consequences of their actions.

=== Plasticity ===
Plasticity denotes intrapersonal variability and focuses heavily on the potentialities and limits of the nature of human development. The notion of plasticity emphasizes that there are many possible developmental outcomes and that the nature of human development is much more open and pluralistic than originally implied by traditional views; there is no single pathway that must be taken in an individual's development across the life span. Plasticity is imperative to current research because the potential for intervention is derived from the notion of plasticity in development. Undesired development or behaviors could potentially be prevented or ameliorated.

==== Applications of Plasticity ====
Neuronal plasticity, or the capability of the brain to adapt to new requirements, is a prime example of plasticity stressing that the individual's ability to change is a lifelong process. Recently, researchers have been analyzing how the spared senses compensate for the loss of vision. Without visual input, blind humans have demonstrated that tactile and auditory functions still fully develop. A superiority of the blind has even been observed when they are presented with tactile and auditory tasks. This superiority may suggest that the specific sensory experiences of the blind may influence the development of certain sensory functions, namely tactile and auditory. One experiment was designed by Röder and colleagues to clarify the auditory localization skills of the blind in comparison to the sighted. They examined both blind human adults’ and sighted human adults’ abilities to locate sounds presented either central or peripheral (lateral) to them. Both congenitally blind adults and sighted adults could locate a sound presented in front of them with precision but the blind were clearly superior in locating sounds presented laterally. Currently, brain-imaging studies have revealed that the sensory cortices in the brain are reorganized after visual deprivation. These findings suggest that when vision is absent in development, the auditory cortices in the brain recruit areas that are normally devoted to vision, thus becoming further refined.

A significant aspect of the aging process is cognitive decline. The dimensions of cognitive decline are partially reversible however, because the brain retains the lifelong capacity for plasticity and reorganization of cortical tissue. Mahncke and colleagues developed a brain plasticity-based training program that induced learning in mature adults experiencing age-related decline. This training program focused intensively on aural language reception accuracy and cognitively demanding exercises that have been proven to partially reverse the age-related losses in memory. It included highly rewarding novel tasks that required attention control and became progressively more difficult to perform. In comparison to the control group, who received no training and showed no significant change in memory function, the experimental training group displayed a marked enhancement in memory that was sustained at the 3-month follow-up period. These findings suggest that cognitive function, particularly memory, can be significantly improved in mature adults with age-related cognitive decline by using brain plasticity-based training methods.

=== Historical embeddedness ===
The perspective of historical embeddedness is composed of two main ideas: the idea that a relationship exists between an individual's development and the socio-cultural setting around them, and also how this setting evolves over time. During the time of adolescence, Baltes believed the socio-cultural setting in which an individual develops plays a distinct role in the development of their personality. This has been exemplified in numerous studies, including Nesselroade and Baltes’, who showed that the level and direction of change in adolescent personality development was influenced as strongly by the socio-cultural settings at the time (in this case, the Vietnam War) as age related factors. The study involved individuals of four different adolescent age groups who all showed significant personality development in the same direction (a tendency to occupy themselves with ethical, moral, and political issues rather than cognitive achievement). Similarly, Edler showed that the Great Depression was a setting that significantly affected the development of adolescents and their corresponding adult personalities, by showing a similar common personality development across age groups. Baltes’ theory also states that the historical socio-cultural setting had an effect on the development of an individual's intelligence. The areas of influence that Baltes thought most important to the development of intelligence were health, education, and work. The first two areas, health and education, significantly affect adolescent development as a healthy child, who is educated effectively, will develop a higher level of intelligence. The environmental factors, health and education, have been suggested by Neiss and Rowe to have as much effect on intelligence as inherited intelligence. The second idea of historical embeddedness is that this socio-cultural setting evolves over time. Therefore, during adolescence, when intelligence is influenced significantly, advances in the areas of health, education, and type of work available to adolescents will show an effect that persists into adulthood. This effect of intelligence not only changing with time (as people age), but also varying by the historical time period a person developed in, was shown in a study by Schaie on adults only ten years apart in age. This study showed that intelligence levels change by cohort, or historical time.

=== Contextualism as a Paradigm ===
Contextualism as a paradigm is Baltes’ idea that three systems of biological and environmental influence work together to influence development: age-graded, history-graded, and nonnormative influences. Baltes wrote that these three influences operate throughout the life course, their effects accumulate with time, and, as a dynamic package, they are responsible for how lives develop. While Baltes was referring to influences over the course of a lifetime, this perspective nonetheless is highly applicable to the study of adolescent development. Age-graded influences are those biological and environmental factors that have a strong correlation with chronological age. Adolescence is a time of much “biological maturation and age-graded socialization events.” History-graded influences are biological determinants that are associated with a specific time period that define the broader bio-cultural context in which an individual develops. This is similar to the perspective of historical embeddedness, which has been shown earlier in the paper to pertain heavily to the study of adolescent development. Nonnormative influences are unpredictable and not tied to a certain developmental time, personally or historically. They are the unique experiences of an individual, whether biological or environment, that shape the development process. This certainly applies to adolescent development as these experiences could occur in the adolescent time period, however they are just as likely to occur in any other period of development. The most important aspect of the perspective of contextualism as a paradigm is that the three systems of influence work together to influence development. Concerning adolescent development, the age-graded influences would help to explain the similarities within a cohort, the history-graded influences would help to explain the differences between cohorts, and the nonnormative influences would explain the idiosyncrasies of each adolescents individual development. When all influences are considered together, it lends to a broader explanation of an adolescent's development.

=== Field of Development as Multidisciplinary ===
Any single discipline's account of behavioural development across the life span would not be able to express all aspects of this theoretical framework. That is why it is suggested explicitly by life span researchers that the combination of disciplines is necessary to define the origins and directionality of this theory. This combination of disciplines would also be able to delineate the source and mechanisms associated with age-graded, history-graded, and nonnormative influences that one discipline, such as psychology, would find quite difficult to approach. The field of psychology would only be able to provide a partial representation of human development from conception to death.

The concept of a multidisciplinary perspective assists in helping one to understand the complexities of lifelong development as well as appreciate just how incomplete the study of behavioural development actually is. Many disciplines are able to contribute important concepts that integrate knowledge, which may ultimately result in the formation of a new and enriched conception of development across the life span.

=== Applications of Life-Span Developmental Psychology ===
==== Positive Youth Development ====
The idea that development is a lifelong process is very beneficial to society because it may help in the identification of qualities or problems that are distinctive in a particular age period. If these qualities or problems could be identified, specific programs could be established such as after-school interventions that enhance positive youth development (PYD).

Positive Youth Development holds the belief that all youths have the potential to become productive, contributing members of society. PYD emphasizes the strengths of youth, promoting their development physically, personally, socially, emotionally, intellectually, and spiritually. Interventions must be conducted with the needs and preferences of the participants kept in mind however; the individuals’ choice, values, and culture must always be considered.

Big Brothers/Big Sisters is a positive youth development program targeted in the community domain that demonstrates substantial behavioural outcomes for youth. This program sought to promote positive identity and competence by creating a strong bond with a healthy adult. These healthy adults, or mentors, committed a minimum of several hours, two to four times a month for a year with a youth that was carefully assigned to them based on their background, preference, and geographic proximity. Youths in this program improved in “school attendance, parental relations, academic performance, and peer emotional support.” Substance use and problem behaviors were also reported as either prevented or reduced.

==== Minnesota Family Investment Plan ====
The study of development across the life span contributes to one of society's most important functions: parenting and fostering the development of the next generation. One of the ways that life-span developmental psychologists contribute to this function is by studying the various social policies implemented by the government and how such policies affect adolescents and children. Does helping poor parents affect the outcomes of their children as well? This issue had been debated for decades and the only way it was resolved was by researching the effects of welfare reform initiatives on children's outcomes.

In the 1990s, the Minnesota Family Investment Plan (MFIP) was implemented by the government to accomplish two goals: to increase employment and reduce poverty. MFIP achieved these goals by providing financial incentives to attend work and introducing mandatory employment-focused activities. The research on the effects of MFIP on the children found that while MFIP did increase employment rates and decrease poverty, it was also linked with benefits for the children of parents receiving welfare. According to the reports given by the mothers, “the children were less likely to exhibit problem behaviours and more likely to perform better in school.”

Many other policies have been researched by life span developmental psychologists in the hopes of improving the quality of life for low-income families and providing feedback on the development of new government policies.

==== Selective Optimization with Compensation Theory ====
Selective optimization with compensation is a developmental process that was first outlined by Baltes in 1980 to describe the relation between age-related changes within individuals and changes in behavioral and cognitive styles. Baltes argues that as individuals advance through life they are increasingly faced by age-related deficits which place limits on their cognitive and behavioral resources. To deal with these limits placed on domains, individuals will begin to invest resources into particular styles and behaviors that are deemed adaptive to the new constraints. This specialization in particular domains and styles will increase the ability in those particular faculties that are deemed more adaptive to growing age-related deficits. Baltes notes, specialization in particular domains and styles takes time, effort, and motivation, requiring individuals to disregard other behavior and cognitive styles which are not deemed adaptive to new developmental limits. The result of this process is an age-related increase in specialized styles and behaviors in order to enhance efficiency and improve performance, while a reduction in unfavourable styles. In response to the reduction in particular styles and behaviors, individuals will utilize specialized capacities as a compensatory mechanism to deal with gaps in capacities created by the specialization process.

== Awards ==
Baltes received the American Psychological Association's Award for Distinguished Contributions to the International Advancement of Psychology and the Novartis Prize for Gerontological Research awarded by the International Association of Gerontology. He also started the Margret M. and Paul B. Baltes Foundation which aims to advance research in developmental psychology and gerontology. He was elected a Foreign Honorary Member of the American Academy of Arts and Sciences in 1991.

== See also ==
- Developmental psychology
- Paul B. Baltes Lecture

== Publications ==
- Baltes, P. B. (1978). Life-Span Development and Behavior. Academic Press. ISBN 9780124318014
- Baltes, P. B., & Mayer, K. U. (Eds.). (1999). The Berlin Aging Study: Aging from 70 to 100; a research project of the Berlin-Brandenburg Academy of Sciences Cambridge University Press, ISBN 0-521-62134-8
- Baltes, P. B., Freund, A. M., & Li, S. (2005). "The psychological science of human aging." In M. L. Johnson (Ed.), The Cambridge Handbook of Age and Aging (pp. 47–71). Cambridge University Press. doi:10.1017/CBO9780511610714.006
- Baltes, P. B., & Smith, J. (2003). "New frontiers in the future of aging: From successful aging of the young old to the dilemmas of the fourth age." Gerontology, 49, 123–135. doi:10.1159/000067946
- Baltes, P. B., Reuter-Lorenz, P. A., & Rösler, F. (Eds.). Lifespan Development and the Brain: The Perspective of Biocultural Co-Constructivism. Cambridge University Press. ISBN 9780511499722
