= Josef Winkler (writer) =

Austrian writer (born 1953)

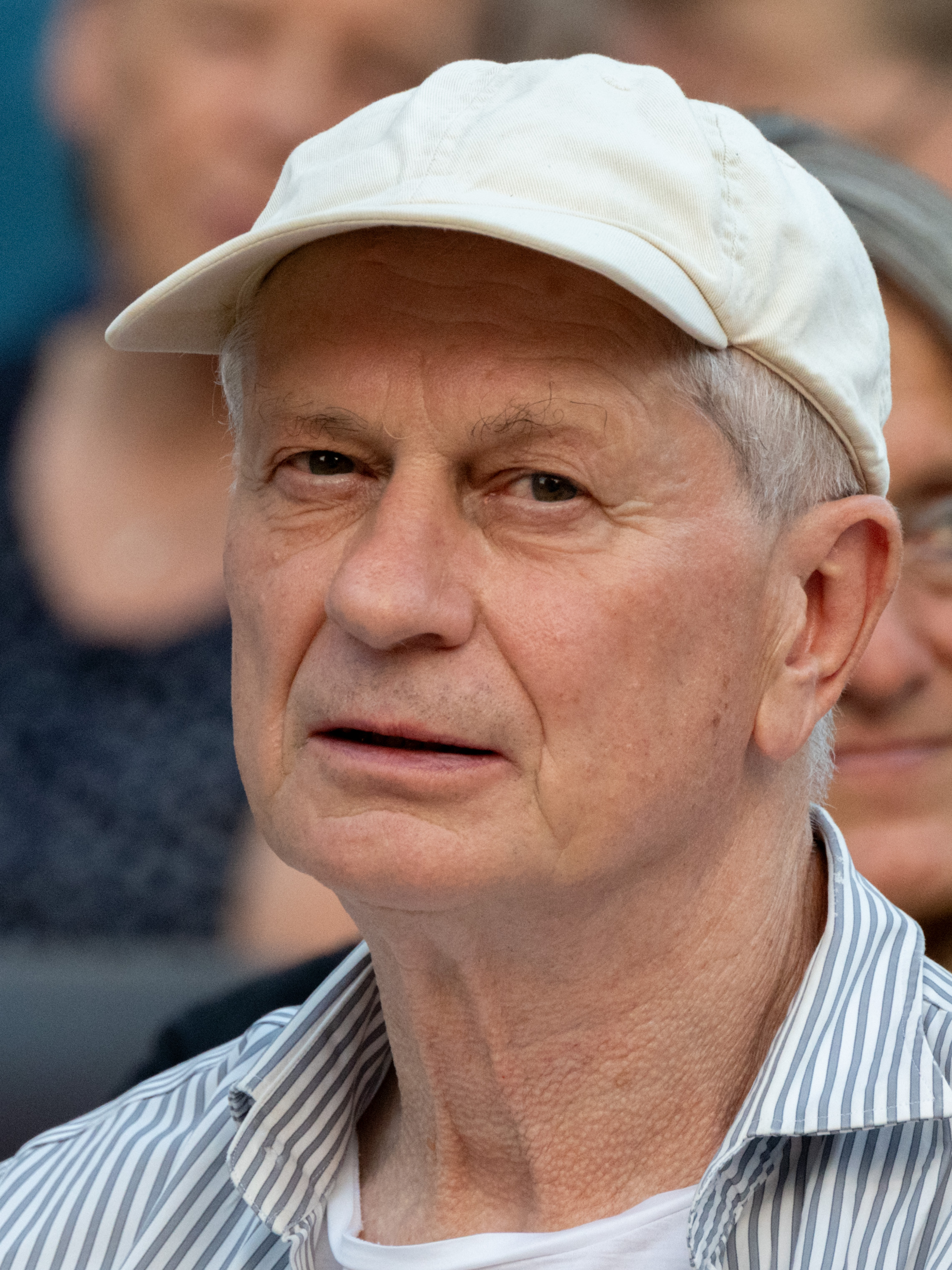
Josef Winkler in 2026

Josef Winkler (born 3 March 1953) is an Austrian writer.

== Biography ==
Josef Winkler was born in Kamering near Paternion in Carinthia (Kärnten) and grew up on his parents' farm. He describes his home as a world without language ("sprachlose Welt") and early on felt drawn to language as a mode of self-expression. He grew up in the context of a difficult triangle – a rather rough father, by whom he felt rejected; a mother who lost her own brothers early on and fell silent; and a deaf-mute farmgirl. When his mother explained that there was no money for books, Winkler soon recognized the (intellectual) class difference between the sons of farmers and teachers. There was an early obsession to acquire books – and thus language.

Following completion of the eight-year rural Austrian primary school, Winkler attended the three-year commercial school in Villach. After a clerical position at a dairy, he went to an evening school to obtain his high school diploma, concurrently working at a publishing house producing books by the widely admired German author of novels on American "Indians," Karl May. From 1973 and 1982, he was employed in the administration of Klagenfurt University, the Alpen-Adria-Universität Klagenfurt. At that time, he organized a literary circle, the Literarischer Arbeitskreis, together with his Carinthian author colleague Alois Brandstetter and edited a literary magazine, the Schreibarbeiten.

In 1979 his novel Menschenkind earned him the second place in the renowned Ingeborg-Bachmann-Preis behind Gert Hofmann. Together with his subsequent two novels, Der Ackermann aus Kärnten and Muttersprache, this book makes up the trilogy Das wilde Kärnten. Josef Winkler's texts are dominated by the themes of death and homosexuality. His renditions of problems individuals encounter in a patriarchal Catholic world have a self-acknowledged autobiographical background. Winkler relates his own work to that of other German-language and international writers with a focus on suicide, isolation and homosexuality such as Jean Genet, Peter Handke and Hans Henny Jahnn. Winkler's numerous trips to both Italy and India are frequently reflected in his works, including Indian death rituals as practiced in the city of Varanasi which are contrasted with Catholic rituals in his home culture. His early work Wortschatz der Nacht was published in 2013. Winnetou, Abel und ich (2014), featuring his early acquaintance with Karl May, includes both an important chapter of his literary autobiography and re-tellings of May's fantastical stories surrounding Winnetoo, an imaginary Indian chief widely known in Central European culture.

On the occasion of the 33rd Ingeborg-Bachmann-Preis 2009, Josef Winkler held the traditional "Klagenfurter Rede zur Literatur". This speech generated significant controversy as it vehemently criticized the governments of Carinthia and its capital city Klagenfurt for failing to establish a city library. While much money was expended for mismanaged banks and 70 million Euros were spent on a soccer stadium in Klagenfurt (Wörthersee Stadion), authorities claimed that they lack the resources for a municipal library.

Josef Winkler is member of two associations of Austrian authors, the Grazer Autorenversammlung and the Interessengemeinschaft österreichischer Autorinnen und Autoren. In October 2010 he was nominated member of the Österreichischen Kunstsenat, the Austrian Art Senate, whose president he now is. Winkler is married and has one son and one daughter. He lives with his family in Klagenfurt.

== Works ==
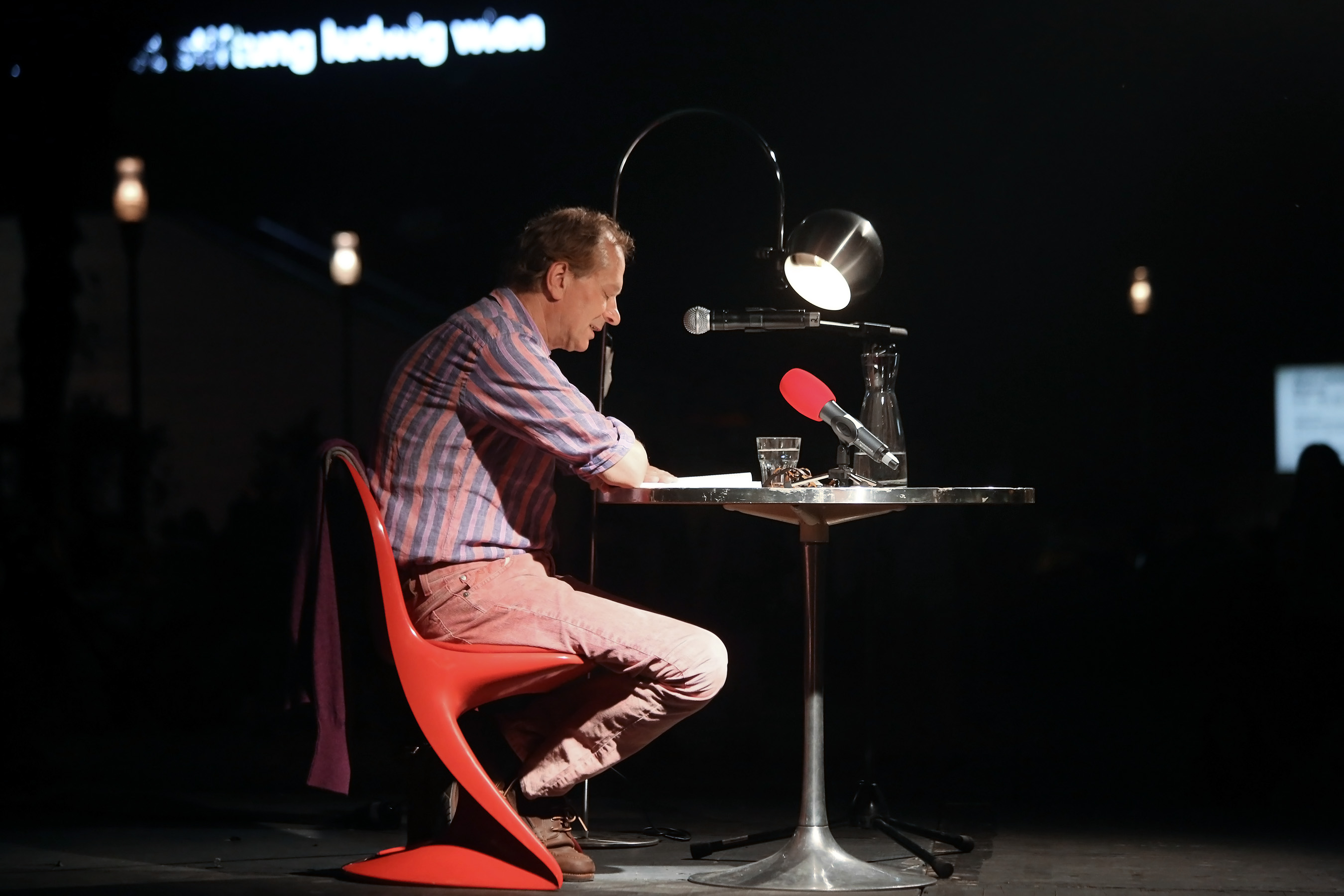
Josef Winkler (Vienna 2013)

- Menschenkind (Suhrkamp, 1979).
- Der Ackermann aus Kärnten (Suhrkamp, 1980).
- Muttersprache (Suhrkamp, 1982).
- Die Verschleppung (Suhrkamp, 1983).
- Der Leibeigene (Suhrkamp, 1987). The Serf, trans. by Michael Mitchell (Ariadne Press, 1997).
- Friedhof der bitteren Orangen (Suhrkamp, 1990). Graveyard of Bitter Oranges, trans. by Adrian West (New York: Contra Mundum Press, 2015).
- Das Zöglingsheft des Jean Genet (Suhrkamp, 1992). Flowers for Jean Genet, trans. Michael Roloff (Ariadne Press, 1997).
- Das wilde Kärnten: Menschenkind, Der Ackermann aus Kärnten, Muttersprache (Suhrkamp, 1995).
- Domra (Suhrkamp, 1996).
- Wenn es soweit ist (Suhrkamp, 1998). When the Time Comes, trans. by Adrian West (New York: Contra Mundum Press, 2013)
- Natura Morta. Römische Novelle (Suhrkamp, 2001). Natura Morta, trans. by Adrian West (New York: Contra Mundum Press, 2014).
- Leichnam, seine Familie belauernd (Suhrkamp, 2003).
- Roppongi. Requiem für einen Vater (Suhrkamp, 2007).
- Ich reiß mir eine Wimper aus und stech dich damit tot (Suhrkamp, 2008).
- Wortschatz der Nacht (Suhrkamp, 2013).
- Mutter und der Bleistift (Suhrkamp, 2013).
- Winnetou, Abel und ich (Suhrkamp, 2014).
- Der Stadtschreiber von Kalkutta (Suhrkamp, 2019).
- Begib dich auf die Reise oder Drahtzieher der Sonnenstrahlen (Suhrkamp, 2020).
- Die Ukrainerin (Suhrkamp, 2022).

== Prizes ==
- Editors' prize of the Ingeborg Bachmann Prize 1979
- Anton Wildgans Prize 1980
- Kranichsteiner Literaturpreis 1990
- Stadtschreiber von Bergen 1994/1995
- Bettina-von-Arnim-Preis 1995
- Berliner Literaturpreis 1996
- manuskripte-Preis des Landes Steiermark 1996
- André-Gide-Preis 2000
- Alfred Döblin Prize 2001
- Otto-Stoessl-Preis 2001
- Franz Nabl Prize of the City of Graz 2005
- Grand Austrian State Prize 2007
- Georg Büchner Prize by Deutsche Akademie für Sprache und Dichtung 2008
- Honorary Doctor, University of Klagenfurt 2009
- Vilenica Prize 2021
