= Antonio Loprieno =

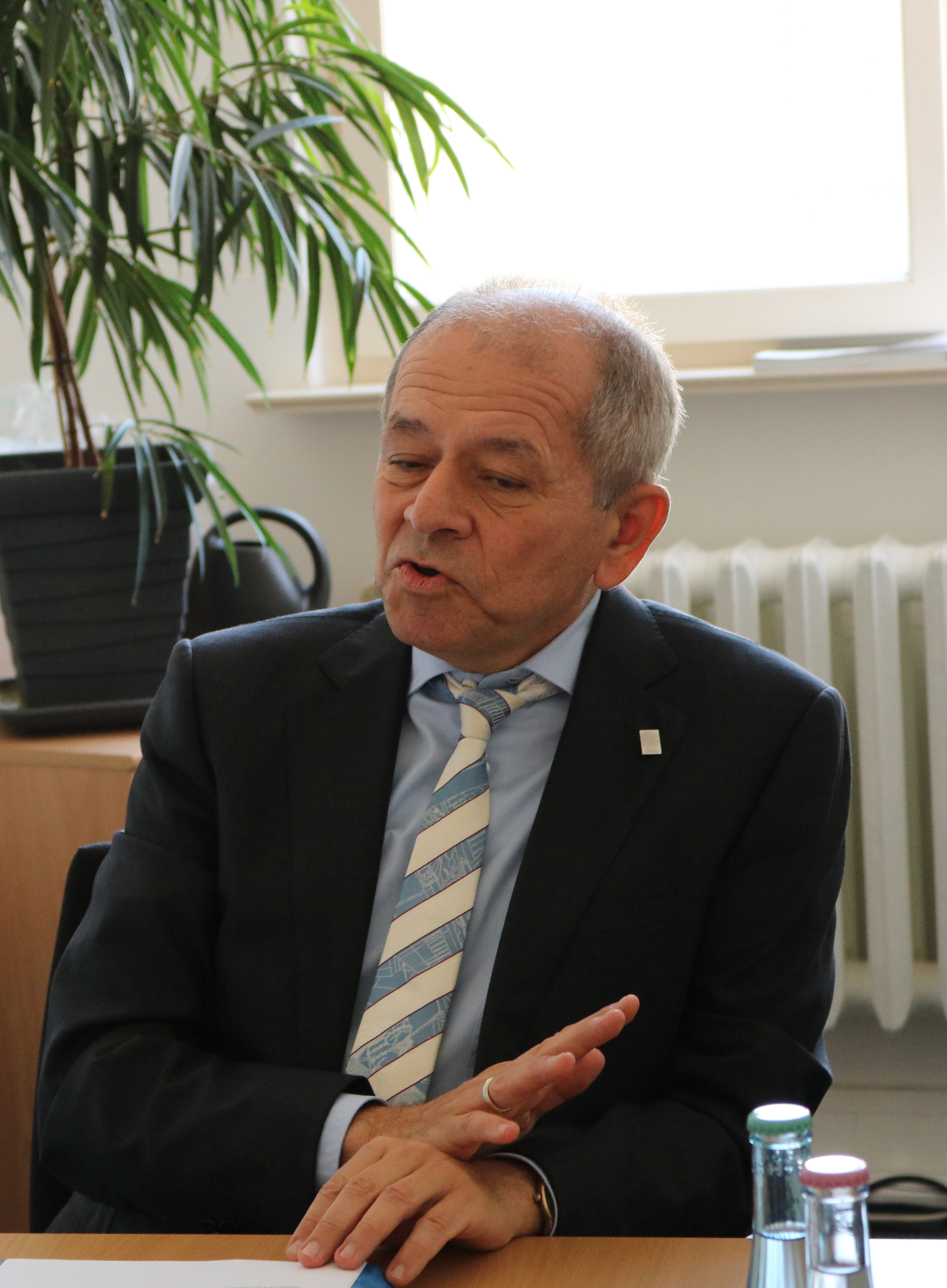
- Loprieno during an interview in Berlin in September 2018
- Born: 1955 (age 70–71); Bari, Apulia, Italy

Antonio Loprieno (born 1955) is a Swiss Italian Egyptologist and Professor of History of Institutions at the University of Basel. From 2005 to 2015, he was rector of the University of Basel. He was also president of the Rectors’ Conference of the Swiss Universities (CRUS) from 2008 to 2015. From 2018 to 2024, he was president of ALLEA, the European Federation of Academies of Sciences and Humanities, and of the Swiss Academies of Arts and Sciences. From December 2019 to December 2020, he was president of the Jacobs University Bremen.

== Biography ==
Loprieno graduated from the European School, Brussels I, obtaining his European Baccalaureate in 1972. He then studied Egyptology, Linguistics, and Semitic Studies at the University of Turin, where he received his doctorate in 1977 and worked until 1981 as a research assistant. He then went to the University of Göttingen with a scholarship from the Alexander von Humboldt Foundation and habilitated in 1984. From 1983 to 1986, he was a lecturer at the University of Perugia, and from 1984 to 1987 at the University of Göttingen.

In 1987, Loprieno was appointed associate professor of Afroasiatic linguistics at the University of Perugia. In 1989, he became full professor of Egyptology at the University of California Los Angeles (UCLA), where he headed the Department of Near Eastern Languages and Cultures from 1991 to 2000. During this time, he was also a visiting professor at the Hebrew University of Jerusalem, at the École Pratique des Hautes Études in Paris and at Heidelberg University.

In 2000, Loprieno became a full professor of Egyptology at the University of Basel, and in July 2005, he was elected rector of the University. He stepped down from his position as rector on 31 July 2015 and returned to research and teaching in Egyptology, history of institutions and academic management.

In May 2018, Loprieno assumed the presidency of the Swiss Academies of Arts and Sciences and took up the post of president of ALLEA, the European Federation of Academies of Sciences and Humanities. In April 2018, he was elected chairman of the Board of Governors of Jacobs University Bremen. On November 12, 2019, Jacobs University announced that after the resignation of Michael Hülsmann and following the proposal of the search committee under Lavinia Jacobs, Loprieno will change into the role of president effective December 1, 2019.

Loprieno is member of the Accademia delle Scienze di Torino, corresponding member of the Göttingen Academy of Sciences and Humanities, of the German Archaeological Institute and other internationally renowned scientific societies. He is also co-editor of the Journal of Egyptian Language and Ancient Studies (ZÄS) and of Lingua Aegyptia — Journal of Egyptian Language Studies (LingAeg).

Loprieno is also honorary president of the church council of the Basel Chiesa evangelica di lingua italiana (Waldensians).

== Selected publications ==
- Das Verbalsystem im Ägyptischen und im Semitischen, Harrassowitz, 1986
- Topos und Mimesis, Harrassowitz, 1986
- Ancient Egyptian - a linguistic introduction, Cambridge University Press, 1995
- Ancient Egyptian literature: history and forms, Brill, 1996
- La pensée et l'écriture: pour une analyse sémiotique de la culture égyptienne, Cybèle, 2012
- Vom Schriftbild, Schwabe Verlag, 2007
- Slavery and servitude, UCLA Encyclopedia of Egyptology, 2012,
- Die entzauberte Universität, Passagen 2016
