= Ralph Hertwig =

German psychologist (born 1963)

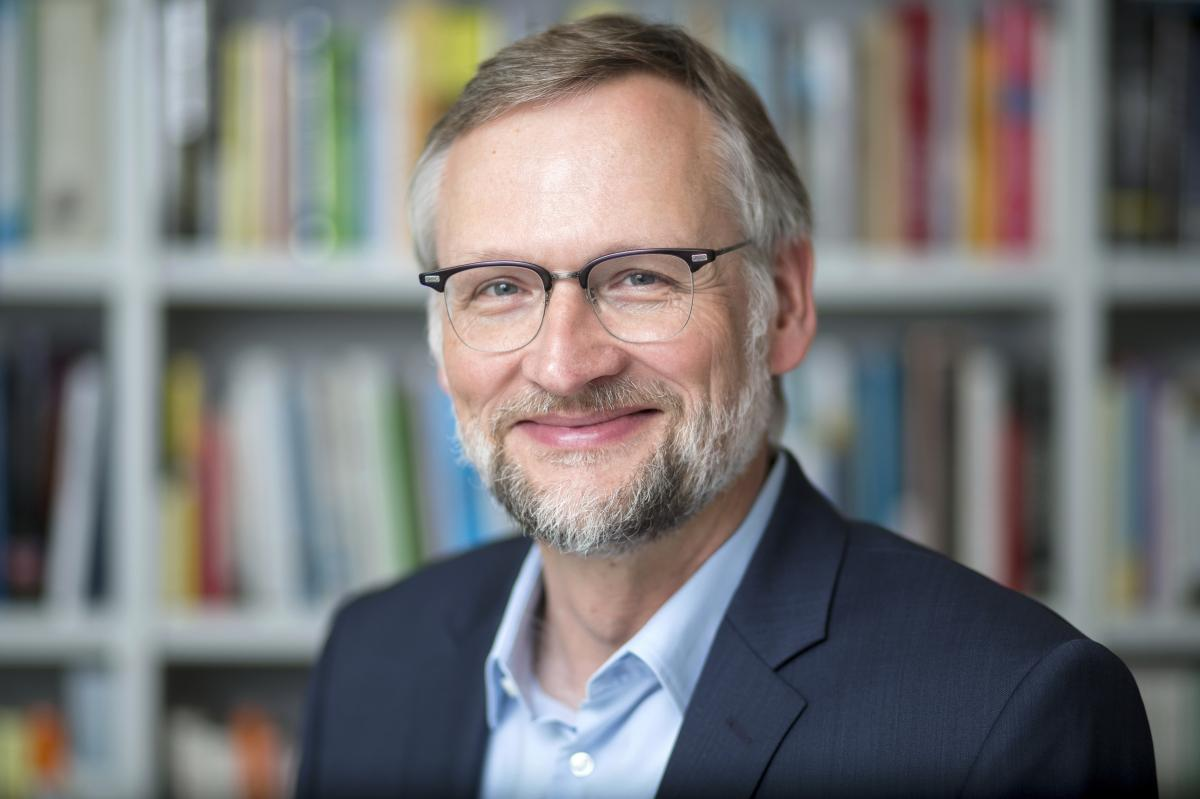
- Born: 4 November 1963 (age 62); Heilbronn, West Germany
- Education: University of Konstanz
- Awards: Gottfried Wilhelm Leibniz Prize (2017)
- Scientific career
- Fields: Psychology; Decision making
- Workplaces: Max Planck Institute for Human Development (Director since 2012)
- Thesis: Why Dr Gould's Homunculus doesn't think like Dr Gould: The "conjunction fallacy" reconsidered (1995)
- Website: www.mpib-berlin.mpg.de/en/staff/ralph-hertwig

Ralph Hertwig (born 4 November 1963, in Heilbronn, West Germany) is a German psychologist whose work focuses on the psychology of human judgment and decision making. Hertwig is Director of the Center for Adaptive Rationality at the Max Planck Institute for Human Development in Berlin, Germany. He grew up with his brothers Steffen Hertwig and Michael Hertwig (parents Walter and Inge Hertwig) in Talheim, Heilbronn.

== Academic career ==
Hertwig received his Ph.D. in Psychology from the University of Konstanz, Germany, in 1995. In the same year, he joined Gerd Gigerenzer's research group at the Max Planck Institute for Psychological Research in Munich; in 1997, the group moved to the Max Planck Institute for Human Development in Berlin. In 2000, Hertwig received a fellowship from the German Research Foundation, which supported his research at Columbia University for three years. Hertwig obtained his Habilitation qualification from the Free University of Berlin in 2003, and in the same year became Assistant Professor for Applied Cognitive Science at the University of Basel, Switzerland. In 2005, he was appointed Full Professor of Cognitive and Decision Sciences. In 2012, Hertwig was appointed Director of the Center for Adaptive Rationality at the Max Planck Institute for Human Development in Berlin.

== Research ==
=== Bounded rationality ===
Hertwig has been a key contributor to the study of bounded rationality, or how people search for information and make decisions with limited resources. His work investigates how decision making can be modeled in terms of fast and frugal heuristics—simple cognitive strategies that use little information and rely on just a few processing steps. Hertwig has examined, for instance, heuristics for making inferences (e.g., fluency heuristic), choices (e.g., priority heuristic, natural mean heuristic), parental allocation decisions (e.g., equity heuristic), and medical decisions (e.g., first impression heuristic).

The rationality of a heuristic depends on whether it matches the structure of the environment in which it is applied. The notion of ecological, rather than logical, rationality challenges a core premise of the heuristics-and-biases program, namely, that intelligent processes must conform with the formal principles of logic, probability theory, and rational choice theory, irrespective of the decision context. Hertwig does not uncritically accept these domain-general standards; rather, he asks which other context-specific concerns may be at play when such principles are violated. In his Ph.D. dissertation, he showed that the conjunction fallacy, a seemingly logical error often illustrated by the Linda problem, reflects people's capacity to infer the meaning of polysemous terms like probability.

Another reason why fast and frugal heuristics can yield good decisions is that they take advantage of evolved cognitive capacities of the human mind. Together with Lael Schooler, Hertwig has shown that ecologically smart forgetting—the capacity to forget information that is unlikely to be needed—fosters the use of heuristics that rely on partial ignorance (e.g., recognition heuristic, fluency heuristic).

=== Learning about risks via description or experience ===
People can learn about the potential consequences of their decisions and the associated probabilities in two ways: by reading summaries of probability information (e.g., drug-package inserts) or by personally experiencing the consequences of their decisions, one at a time (e.g., going out on dates). Using monetary lotteries to compare these two learning modes, Hertwig and colleagues observed a "description-experience gap," a phenomenon by which rare events are given too much weight in decisions from description and too little weight in decisions from experience. This occurs partly because decisions from experience are based on small samples, where people are simply less likely to experience the rare event. The description–experience gap has been observed across thousands of choices and found to generalize beyond monetary gambles to domains including causal reasoning, intertemporal choice, consumer choice, investment decisions, medical decisions, and adolescent risk taking.

=== Deliberate ignorance ===
People often deliberately choose not to know. For example, up to 55% of those who get tested for HIV do not return to pick up their results. The conscious choice not to seek or use information has been called deliberate ignorance. In a theoretical article, Hertwig and Christoph Engel argued that deliberate ignorance is not necessarily an anomaly but can serve important functions. One such function is to act as an emotion-regulation device: people may avoid potentially threatening health information because it compromises cherished beliefs, they anticipate mental discomfort, or they want to keep hope alive. Hertwig and Engel are also co-editors of an interdisciplinary book exploring manifestations of deliberate ignorance from the right not to know in genetic testing to collective amnesia in transformational societies; from blinding in orchestral auditions to "don't ask, don't tell" policies in the military and beyond; and from efforts to prevent algorithms feeding on discriminatory data to the strategic lack of funding for research into gun violence.

=== Boosting ===
To date, most public policy interventions informed by behavioral science evidence involve "nudges"; that is, non-fiscal and non-regulatory interventions that steer (nudge) people in a specific direction while preserving freedom of choice. Hertwig's work has focused on "boosts," an alternative class of non-fiscal and non-regulatory policy interventions grounded in behavioral science. Boosts aim to improve people's decisional, cognitive, and motivational competences, making it easier for them to exercise their own agency. Instead of simply providing information, boosts offer a simple and sustainable strategy for successfully dealing with a given task. For instance, a boost with proven effectiveness in improving the quality of relationships is to imagine oneself as a third-party spectator when involved in a quarrel, and to mentally engage with this perspective-shifting strategy through quick writing exercises. In an article written in collaboration with Till Grüne-Yanoff, Hertwig examined how boosts differ from nudges in terms of the psychological mechanisms through which they operate, as well as their normative implications for transparency and autonomy. For instance, while nudges can skirt conscious deliberation and therefore risk being manipulative, boosts require the individual's active cooperation, and thus need to be explicit and transparent. Other important publications by Hertwig tackle questions such as when boosts are more appropriate than nudges, how to boost nutritional health, how statistical information can best be communicated to improve risk literacy, and how collective intelligence can be harnessed to boost medical diagnostic decisions.

== Selected works ==
=== Journal articles ===
- Hertwig, Ralph; Barron, Greg; Weber, Elke U.; Erev, Ido (2004). "Decisions from Experience and the Effect of Rare Events in Risky Choice". Psychological Science. 15 (8): 534–539. doi:10.1111/j.0956-7976.2004.00715.x. hdl:11858/00-001M-0000-002E-57CE-F. PMID 15270998. S2CID 12977034.
- Hertwig, Ralph; Davis, Jennifer Nerissa; Sulloway, Frank J. (2002). "Parental investment: How an equity motive can produce inequality". Psychological Bulletin. 128 (5): 728–745. doi:10.1037/0033-2909.128.5.728. hdl:11858/00-001M-0000-0025-913B-1. PMID 12206192.
- Hertwig, Ralph; Engel, Christoph (2016). "Homo Ignorans". Perspectives on Psychological Science. 11 (3): 359–372. doi:10.1177/1745691616635594. hdl:11858/00-001M-0000-002A-C462-8. PMID 27217249. S2CID 27556679.
- Hertwig, Ralph; Gigerenzer, Gerd (1999). "The 'conjunction fallacy' revisited: How intelligent inferences look like reasoning errors". Journal of Behavioral Decision Making. 12 (4): 275–305. doi:10.1002/(sici)1099-0771(199912)12:4<275::aid-bdm323>3.0.co;2-m. hdl:11858/00-001M-0000-0025-9EBC-6.
- Hertwig, Ralph; Gigerenzer, Gerd; Hoffrage, Ulrich (1997). "The reiteration effect in hindsight bias". Psychological Review. 104: 194–202. doi:10.1037/0033-295X.104.1.194. hdl:11858/00-001M-0000-0025-A38B-2.
- Hertwig, Ralph; Grüne-Yanoff, Till (2017). "Nudging and Boosting: Steering or Empowering Good Decisions". Perspectives on Psychological Science. 12 (6): 973–986. doi:10.1177/1745691617702496. hdl:11858/00-001M-0000-002E-8D6F-D. PMID 28792862. S2CID 25989965.
- Hertwig, Ralph; Herzog, Stefan M. (2009). "Fast and Frugal Heuristics: Tools of Social Rationality". Social Cognition. 27 (5): 661–698. doi:10.1521/soco.2009.27.5.661. hdl:11858/00-001M-0000-002E-576B-B.
- Hertwig, Ralph; Ortmann, Andreas (2001). "Experimental practices in economics: A methodological challenge for psychologists?". Behavioral and Brain Sciences. 24 (3): 383–403. doi:10.1017/s0140525x01004149. hdl:11858/00-001M-0000-002E-5A37-B. PMID 11682798. S2CID 19346375.
- Schooler, Lael J.; Hertwig, Ralph (2005). "How forgetting aids heuristic inference". Psychological Review. 112 (3): 610–628. doi:10.1037/0033-295X.112.3.610. hdl:11858/00-001M-0000-0025-838B-B. PMID 16060753.

=== Books ===
- Gigerenzer, Gerd (2011). Heuristics : the foundations of adaptive behavior. Oxford New York: Oxford University Press. ISBN 978-0-19-974428-2. OCLC 606053731.
- Hertwig, Ralph (2020). Deliberate ignorance : choosing not to know. Cambridge, Massachusetts: The MIT Press. ISBN 978-0-262-04559-9. OCLC 1202406773.
- Hertwig, Ralph (2013). Simple heuristics in a social world. New York: Oxford University Press. ISBN 978-0-19-538843-5. OCLC 757177366.
- Hertwig, Ralph (2019). Taming uncertainty. Cambridge: MIT Press. ISBN 978-0-262-03987-1. OCLC 1099683077.

== Honors and awards ==
- Heckhausen Young Scientist Prize (1996)
- Charlotte and Karl Bühler Early Career Award (2006)
- Member of the German Academy of Sciences Leopoldina (elected 2010)
- Fellow of the Association for Psychological Science (nominated 2011)
- Member of the Wilhelm-Wundt Society (elected 2012)
- Gottfried Wilhelm Leibniz Prize (2017), Germany's most important research prize, in recognition of Hertwig's pioneering work on the psychology of human judgment and decision making

== Media coverage ==
- Reynolds, Gretchen (19 July 2018). "Parents aren't good judges of their kids' sugar intake". The New York Times.
- "Geo Wissen: Wie wir mit einfachen Prinzipien bessere Entscheidungen treffen". www.geo.de/magazine.
- "Scobel: Die Kunst der Entscheidung". www.3sat.de.
- "Interview: Verantwortung von Mensch und Natur". www.3sat.de.
- "Gespräch über Entscheidungshilfen – Allein so schlau wie viele". www.sueddeutsche.de/wissen. 17 May 2010.
- "Es sind die leisen Killer, die uns töten". www.welt.de.
- "Was die Reihenfolge der Geschwister über die Persönlichkeit aussagt". www.welt.de.
