= Manfried Welan =

Austrian politician (1937–2024)

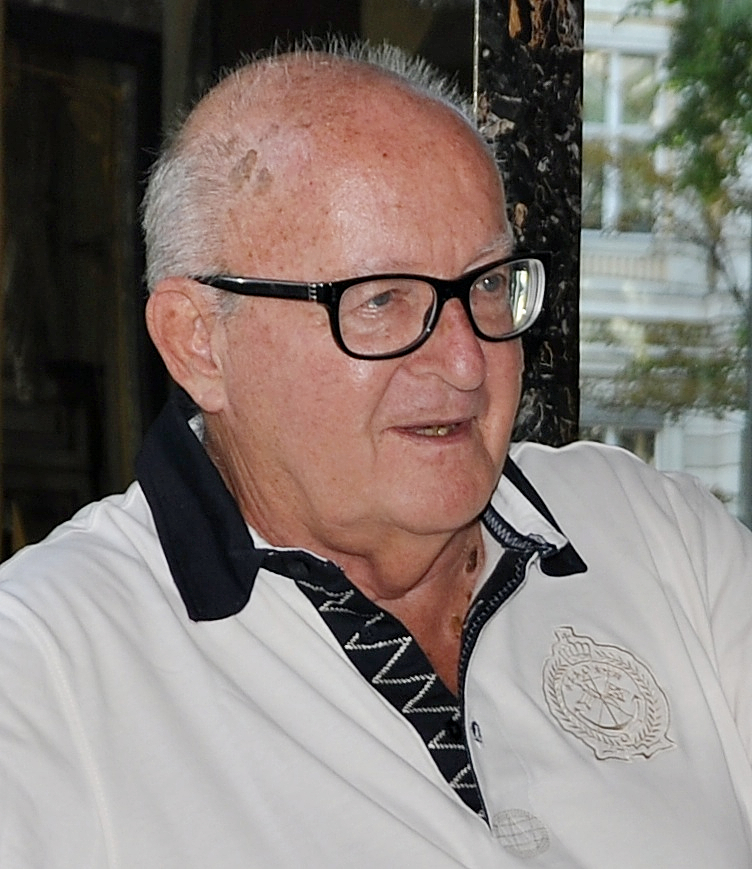
- Welan in 2012

Third President of the Municipal Council and Landtag of Vienna
- In office 1988–1991
- Preceded by: Gertrude Stiehl
- Succeeded by: Wolfgang Petrik

Personal details
- Born: 13 June 1937 Vienna, Austria
- Died: 22 May 2024 (aged 86) Vienna, Austria
- Party: ÖVP
- Education: University of Vienna
- Occupation: Lawyer

Manfried Welan (13 June 1937 – 22 May 2024) was an Austrian lawyer and politician. A member of the Austrian People's Party, he served as third president of the Municipal Council and Landtag of Vienna from 1988 to 1991.

Welan died on 22 May 2024, at the age of 86.
