= Peter Skalicky =

Austrian academic (1941–2025)

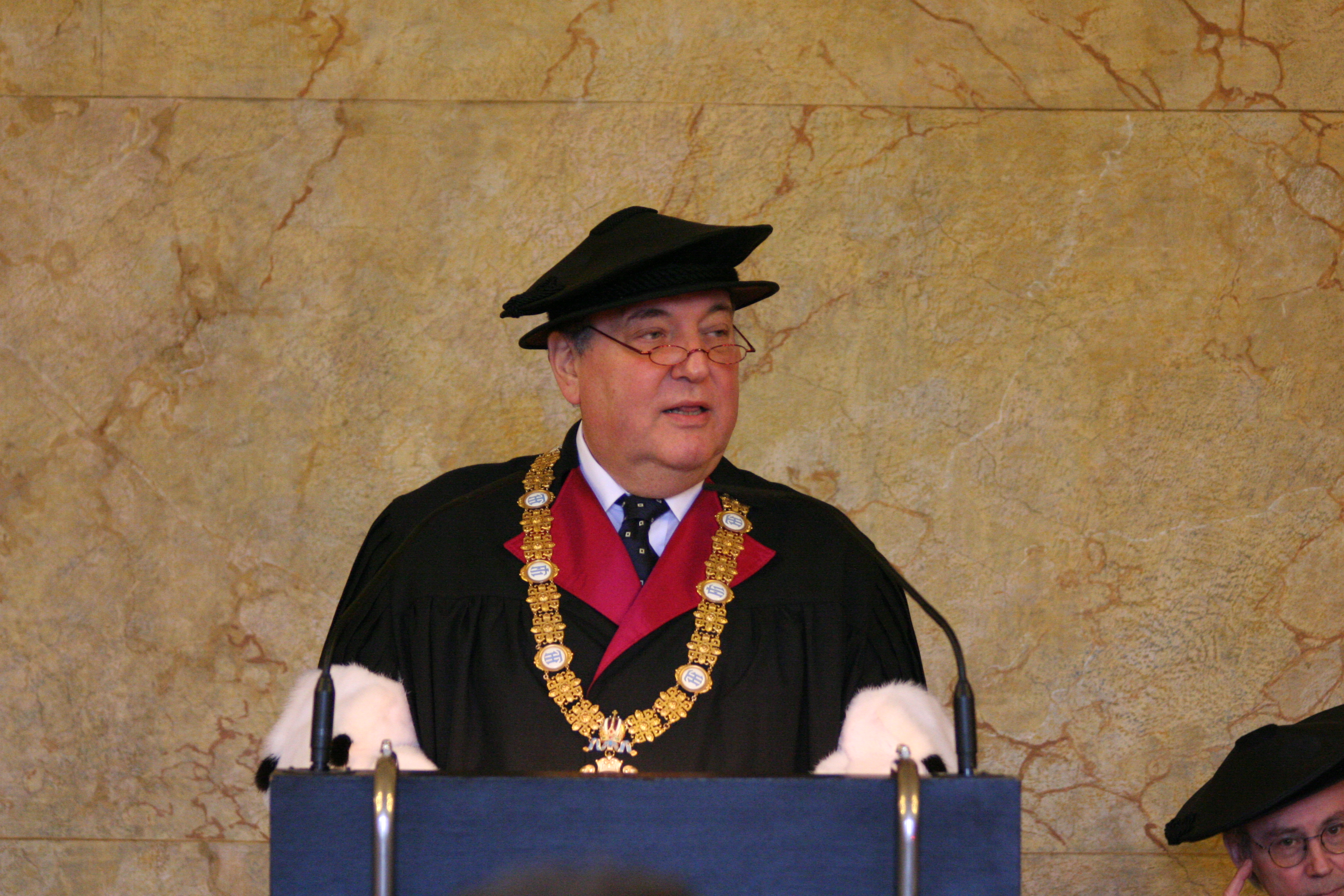

Peter Skalicky (25 April 1941 – 3 November 2025) was an Austrian academic who was the rector of TU Wien.

== Life and career ==
Skalicky was born in Berlin, Germany, on 25 April 1941. After taking his A-levels in Vienna, he studied physics at TU Wien. He wrote his PhD thesis on Röntgen topography. In 1973, he became an associate professor. Since 1979, he has been a full professor of applied physics. From 1991 until 2011, he was rector of TU Wien. He was followed in this function by Sabine Seidler.

Skalicky was vice chair on the Council of the University of Leoben.

He received an Officier dans l'Ordre national du mérite from the French ambassador. He was a member of the European Academy of Sciences and Arts.

Skalicky died on 3 November 2025, at the age of 84.
