= Othmar Kühn =

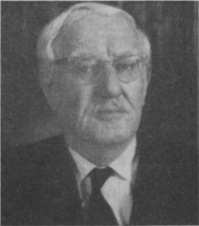
- Kühn in 1965
- Born: 5 November 1892; Vienna, Austria
- Died: 26 March 1969 (aged 76); Vienna, Austria
- Scientific career
- Fields: Geology, Paleontology
- Institutions: University of Vienna

Othmar Kühn (5 November 1892 – 26 March 1969) was an Austrian geologist and paleontologist at the University of Vienna who was a member of the Nazi Party, serving in the Wehrmacht as a military geologist during World War II. He worked mainly on Cretaceous stratigraphy and began a catalogue of the fossils of Austria, Fossilium catalogus Austriae.

== Life and work ==
Kühn was born in Vienna in a business family. After schooling, he joined a business school and worked at a brewery from 1914 before joining the University of Vienna. He served in Italy during World War I and was wounded, receiving a medal for bravery. He studied botany under Richard Wettstein and Carl Diener, receiving a doctorate in 1919. He then worked as a school teacher while also spending time at the Natural History Museum in Vienna. He became a member of the NSDAP and served as a military geologist in eastern Europe. At the end of the War, he had been found to be uninvolved and rehabilitated. He became a rector of the University of Vienna.

He died at Vienna and is buried at the Döblinger Friedhof.
