= Richard Carl Meister =

German linguist

Richard Carl Meister (July 27, 1848 – November 30, 1912) was a German classical scholar and linguist born in Dresden. He specialized in the field of Greek dialects.

From 1872 he taught classes at the Old St Nicholas School in Leipzig, where in 1892 he received the title of professor. Among his written works are the following:

- De dialecto Heracliensium italicorum, 1871.
- Die griechischen Dialekte auf Grundlage von Ahrens' Werk: De Graecae linguae dialectis (Greek dialects on the basis of Franz Heinrich Ludolf Ahrens' work: "De Graecae Linguae Dialectis"); (2 volumes 1882, 1889).
- Zum eleischen, arkadischen und kyprischen Dialekte (On Elean, Arcadian and Cypriot dialects), 1890.
- Die Mimiamben des Herodas (The "Mimiamben" of Herodas), 1893.
- Dorer und Achäer (Dorians and Achaeans), 1904.
