= Karl Ulrich Mayer =

German sociologist (born 1945)

- Born: 10 April 1945 (age 81); Eybach, Germany
- Education: University of Tübingen; Gonzaga University; Fordham University; University of Constance; University of Mannheim
- Spouse: Martha Mayer
- Children: Uljana; Roman; Antonia
- Awards: Distinguished Scholar Award from the American Sociological Association Section on Aging and the Life Course (1999)
- Scientific career
- Fields: Sociology
- Institutions: Max Planck Institute for Human Development; Yale University
- Thesis: Fluktuation und Umschichtung. Untersuchungen zur sozialen Mobilität in der Bundesrepublik Deutschland (1977)

Karl Ulrich Mayer (born 10 April 1945) is a German sociologist. He is Director Emeritus of the Max Planck Institute for Human Development in Berlin, Germany, as well as the Stanley B. Resor Professor Emeritus of Sociology and Professor at the Institution for Social and Policy Studies at Yale University. He was president of the Leibniz Association from 2010 to 2014 and chaired the Department of Sociology at Yale from 2005 to 2010. He was director of the Max Planck Institute for Human Development from 1983 to 2005, and was the founding editor of the European Sociological Review from 1985 to 1990.

Mayer is a member of the German National Academy of Sciences Leopoldina since 1998 and the Berlin-Brandenburg Academy of Sciences, a corresponding fellow of the British Academy since 2000, and a fellow of the American Academy of Arts and Sciences since 1996, the Academia Europaea since 1989, the American Association for the Advancement of Science, and the European Academy of Sociology.
