= Max Planck Institute for Human Development =

Social science research organization located in Berlin, Germany

Coordinates: 52°28′7″N 13°18′12″E

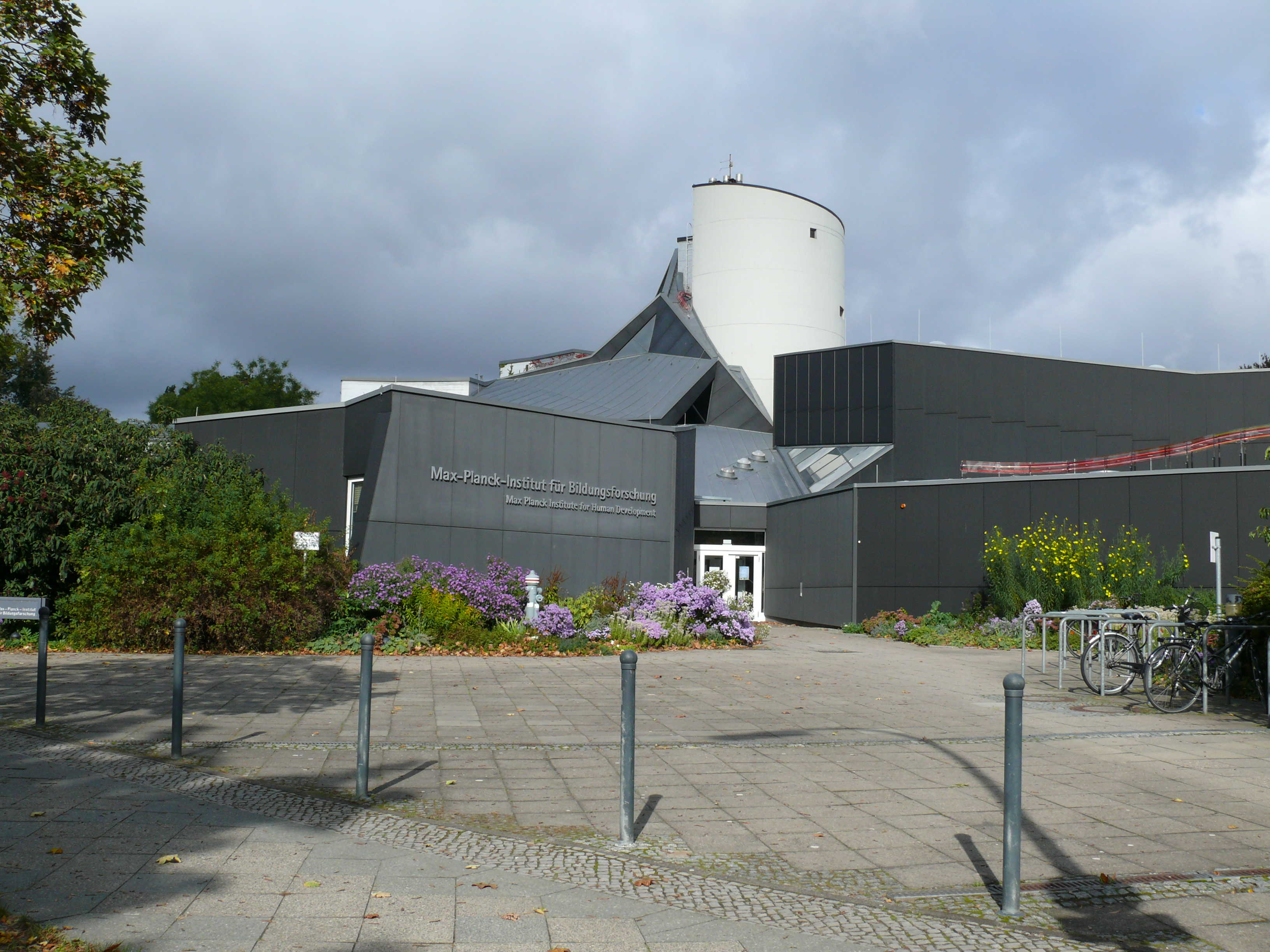
- Max-Planck-Institute for Human Development
- Abbreviation: MPIB
- Type: Research institute
- Location: Berlin
- Directors: Ralph Hertwig, Simone Kühn, Ulman Lindenberger, Iyad Rahwan
- Parent organization: Max Planck Society
- Website: www.mpib-berlin.mpg.de

The Max Planck Institute for Human Development (German: Max-Planck-Institut für Bildungsforschung, MPIB) is a social science research organization. Located in Berlin, it is one of over 80 institutions run by the Max Planck Society (MPG). It was initiated in 1961 and officially began operations in 1963 under the name Institute for Educational Research in the Max Planck Society, before receiving its current name in 1971. Its first director was Hellmut Becker. The institute is part of the Human Sciences Section of the MPG.

Research activities focus on the development and education of humans, with an emphasis on basic research. The concept of education is defined broadly, embracing both formal educational processes as well as developmental processes from childhood to old age. Currently, around 350 employees contribute to interdisciplinary research in four research centers, and three research groups.

Research Centers

- Center for Adaptive Rationality (director in 2025: Ralph Hertwig)
- Center for Lifespan Psychology (director in 2025: Ulman Lindenberger)
- Center for Environmental Neuroscience (director in 2025: Simone Kühn)
- Center for Humans and Machines (director in 2025: Iyad Rahwan)

Research Groups

- Max Planck Research Group Biosocial | Biology, Social Disparities, and Development (Head: Laurel Raffington)
- Emmy Noether-Group RAVEN (Head: Chi (Zoe) Ngo)
- Max Planck Research Group MR Physics (Head: Benedikt Poser)

The Max Planck UCL Centre for Computational Psychiatry and Ageing Research took up its work in April 2014; it was the result of the existing collaboration between the MPG and University College London that began in 2011. The centre is dedicated to studying the causes of psychiatric disorders as well as the causes of individual differences in cognitive development, with an emphasis on adulthood and old age.

The Harding Centre for Risk Literacy, which was opened at the MPIB in 2009, is now based at the University of Potsdam. The centre's research focuses on the vision of the responsible citizen who knows how to deal with the risks of a modern technological world in an informed manner. The director of the Harding Center is Gerd Gigerenzer.

The Research Center for Adaptive Behavior and Cognition (Director: Gerd Gigerenzer) ended its activities in 2017.

The Research Center of Educational Research (Director: Jürgen Baumert) ended its activities in 2010. Its best-known projects were the TIMS study (TIMSS) and the PISA study, whose results received wide attention by both the mass media and politicians.

The institute is located in Wilmersdorf, a neighbourhood in the southwest of Berlin, immediately bordering on the neighborhood of Dahlem, and is therefore considered part of Dahlem's traditional science district. This is home to a number of scientific organizations such as the Free University Berlin, which works together with the institute.

The founding director of the MPIB was Hellmut Becker, subsequently joined by Dietrich Goldschmidt (1963) and Saul B. Robinsohn (1964) as the first generation of directors. They were followed by directors Wolfgang Edelstein (1973), Peter M. Roeder (1973) and Friedrich Edding (director from 1973), Paul B. Baltes (1980), Karl Ulrich Mayer (1983), Jürgen Baumert (1996), Gerd Gigerenzer (1997), Ulman Lindenberger (2003), Ute Frevert (2008), Ralph Hertwig (2012), Iyad Rahwan (2019) and Simone Kühn (2024).

During 2024, over 60% of the institute's research was in the area of Biological Sciences, with Biology and Health making up 85% of research work. Publications were mainly from the field of social sciences, with Psychology, Human Development and Economics making up 75% of published articles.

== See also ==
- List of universities, colleges, and research institutions in Berlin
