= Adolf Holl =

Austrian writer (1930–2020)

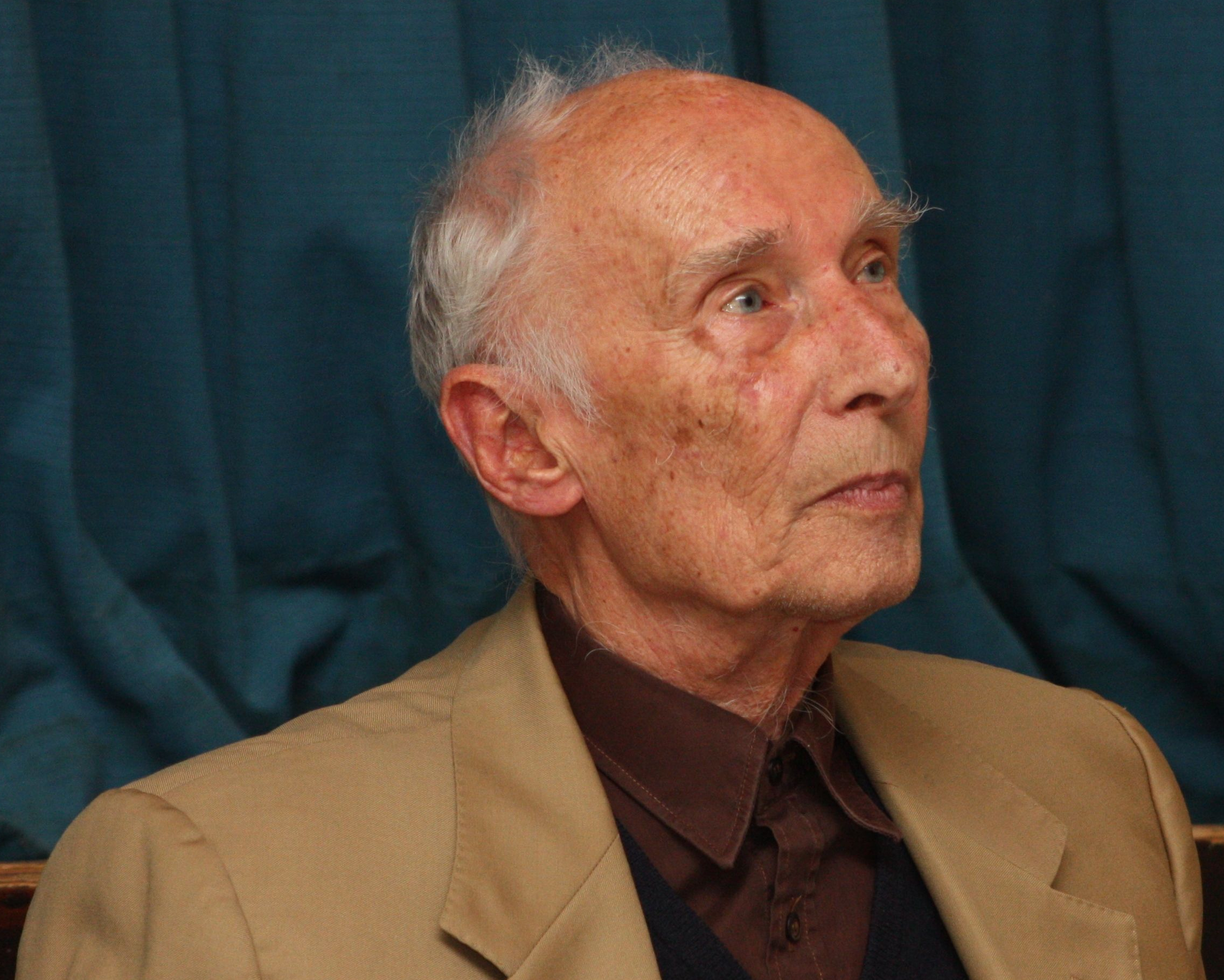
- Holl in 2012
- Born: May 13, 1930; Vienna, Austria
- Died: May 23, 2020 (aged 90)
- Occupations: Theologian, Catholic Chaplain, writer, religious studies scholar
- Website: https://www.adolf-holl.at/

Adolf Holl (German pronunciation: [ˈaːdɔlf hɔl]; 13 May 1930 – 23 January 2020) was an Austrian Catholic writer and theologian. He lived in Vienna, where he was Chaplain of the University of Vienna and a lecturer in its Department of Catholic Theology.

Because of conflicts with Church authorities, he was suspended from his teaching and priestly duties. He wrote many books, including Jesus in Bad Company and The Last Christian: A Biography of Francis of Assisi.

Holl had doctorates in philosophy and theology from the University of Vienna. Ordained a Catholic priest in 1954, he served as a parish priest and professor of theology until 1973, when longstanding controversies with church officials led to his dismissal from university and parish posts.

== Published works ==
- — (1960). Augustins Bergpredigtexegese : nach seinem Frühwerk De sermone domini in monte libri duo [Augustine's exegesis on the Sermon on the Mount based on his early work De sermone domini in monte, book two] (in German). Verlag Herder. OCLC 22221813.
- — (1961). Seminalis ratio : ein Beitrag zur Begegnung der Philosophie mit den Naturwissenschaften [Seminalis ratio: a contribution to the encounter between philosophy and the natural sciences] (in German). Herder. OCLC 19282987.
- — (1963). Die Welt der Zeichen bei Augustin; religionsphänomenologische Analyse des 13. Buches der Confessiones [The symbolic world of Augustine: A religious phenomenological analysis of the 13th book of the Confessions] (in German). Herder. OCLC 6849828.
- Lindner, Traugott; Lentner, Leopold; Holl, Adolf (1963). Priesterbild und Berufswahlmotive. Ergebnisse einer sozialpsychologischen Untersuchung bei den Wiener Mittelschülern [Image of priests and motives for choosing a profession: Results of a social-psychological investigation among Viennese high school students] (in German).
- Augustinus, Aurelius; Perl, Carl Johann; Holl, Adolf; Augustinus, Aurelius (1964). Dreizehn Bücher Bekenntnisse [Thirteen Books of Confessions] (in German). ISBN 3-506-70452-4. OCLC 245976852.
- — (1965). Das Religionsgespräch der Gegenwart: Voraussetzungen und Prinzipien [The religious discussion of the present: Requirements and principles] (in German). Verlag Styria. OCLC 13864264.
- Holl, Adolf; Nedbal, Johannes (1965). Wegweisungen im Glauben: aktuelle Fragen zum katholischen Dogma [Expulsion from the faith: Current issues for Catholic dogma] (in German). Vienna Freiburg Basel: Herder. ASIN B0000BJJR1. OCLC 214959906.
- — (1966). "Sigmum und Chiffer: Eine religionsphilosophische Konfrontation Augustins mit Karl Jaspers" [Sign and cipher: A religious-philosophical confrontation between Augustine and Karl Jaspers]. Revue d'Études Augustiniennes et Patristiques (in French). 12 (1–2). Brepols: 157–182. doi:10.1484/j.rea.5.104119. ISSN 1768-9260.
- Fischer, H.; Holl, A. (1968). "Attitude envers la religion et l'Eglise en Autriche Enquête auprès des soldats de l'armée autrichienne" [Attitudes towards religion and the Church in the Survey of Austrian army soldiers]. Social Compass (in French). 15 (1). SAGE Publications: 13–35. doi:10.1177/003776866801500102. ISSN 0037-7686. S2CID 146214190.
- —; Fischer, Gerhard H (1968). Kirche auf Distanz; eine religionspsychologische Untersuchung über die Einstellung österreichischer Soldaten zu Kirche und Religion [Church at a distance: A religio-psychological study on the setting of Austrian soldiers to church and religion] (in German). W. Braumüller. OCLC 2423013.
- — (1969). Gott im Nachrichtennetz; religiöse Information in der modernen Gesellschaft [God in the news network: Religious information in modern society] (in German). Rombach. OCLC 7816461.
- — (1970). "Max Scheler's Sociology of Knowledge and his position in relation to Theology". Social Compass. 17 (2). SAGE Publications: 231–241. doi:10.1177/003776867001700202. ISSN 0037-7686. S2CID 145756155.
- —; Crépin, Hyacinthe (1971). "La recherche appliquée: le cas du " Katholiek Sociaal Kerkelijk Instituut (KASKI) " aux Pays-Bas" [Applied research: the case of the “Katholiek Sociaal Kerkelijk Instituut (KASKI)” in the Netherlands]. Social Compass (in French). 18 (4). SAGE Publications: 621–637. doi:10.1177/003776867101800407. ISSN 0037-7686. S2CID 145438735.
- — (1971). Jesus in schlechter Gesellschaft (in German). Stuttgart: Deutsche Verlags-Anstalt. ISBN 978-3-421-01574-7. OCLC 47310743. Apparently also published as Jezus in slecht gezelschap (in German). Bilthoven: Amboboeken. 1971. ISBN 978-90-263-0176-6. OCLC 63484782. Translated as Jesus in bad company. New York: Holt, Rinehart and Winston. 1973. ISBN 978-0-03-001386-7. OCLC 567310.
- — (1973). Tod und Teufel (in German). OCLC 249911791. Translated as Death and the Devil. New York: Seabury Press. 1976. ISBN 978-0-8164-0313-4. OCLC 2189016.
- — (1977). Mystik für Anfänger [Mysticism for beginners] (in German). ISBN 978-3-421-01772-7. OCLC 611014979.
- — (1977). "Achtsamkeit auf Mythologie: Gespräch mit dem Wiener Theologen Dr. Adolf Holl" [Mindfulness of mythology: conversation with the Viennese theologian Dr. Adolf Holl]. Lutherische Monatshefte [Lutheran monthly notebooks] (in German). Vol. 16, no. 5. pp. 282–283. ISSN 0024-7618.
- — (1978). Wo Gott wohnt d. Geschichte e. langen Bekanntschaft [Where God lives: The story of a long acquaintance] (in German). Frankfurt/M., Berlin, Vienna: Ullstein. ISBN 3-548-03484-5. OCLC 74451714.
- — (1979). Der letzte Christ (in German). Stuttgart: Deutsche Verlags-Anstalt. ISBN 3-421-01924-X. OCLC 714252199. Translated as The Last Christian: A Biography of Francis of Assisi. 1979. ISBN 9780385154994.
- — (1981). Religionen [Religions] (in German). ISBN 978-3-421-06078-5. OCLC 251575903.
- — (1985). Mitleid im Winter: Erfahrungen mit einem unbequemen Gefühl [Pity in winter: Experiences with an uncomfortable feeling] (in German). OCLC 74681501.
- — (1987). Die zweite Wirklichkeit Esoterik, Parapsychologie, Okkultismus, Grenzerfahrungen, Magie, Wunder [The second reality: Esotericism, parapsychology, occultism, extreme experiences, magic, and miracles] (in German). Vienna: Ueberreuter. ISBN 3-8000-3223-6. OCLC 74863721.
- — (1988). "Das Heilige: Nachruf auf eine Kopfgeburt" [The sacred: obituary for a fantasy]. Kursbuch (in German). 93: 17–25.
- — (1989). Taufschein katholisch Prominente antworten auf die Frage: Wie hältst Du's mit der Religion [Baptism certificate: Catholic celebrities answer the question: How do you feel about religion] (in German). Frankfurt am Main: Eichborn. ISBN 3-8218-0419-X. OCLC 243157338.
- — (1990). Der Fisch aus der Tiefe, oder, Die Freuden der Keuschheit [The fish from the deep, or, The joys of chastity] (in German). Reinbek bei Hamburg: Rowohlt. ISBN 3-498-02900-2. OCLC 24872954.
- — (1990). Neues vom Tod heutige Umgangsformen mit dem Sterbenmüssen [News about death: Today's ways of dealing with having to die] (in German). Vienna: Ueberreuter. ISBN 3-8000-3343-7. OCLC 260164870.
- — (1991). Im Keller des Heiligtums : Geschlecht und Gewalt in der Religion [In the basement of the sanctuary: Gender and violence in religion] (in German). Kreuz Verlag. ISBN 3-7831-1081-5. OCLC 26928679.
- — (1992). Wie ich ein Priester wurde, warum Jesus dagegen war, und was dabei herausgekommen ist [How I became a priest, why Jesus was against it, and what came of it] (in German). Reinbek bei Hamburg: Rowohlt. ISBN 3-498-02915-0. OCLC 28963904.
- — (1992), "Nur wer im Fernsehen ist, der existiert wirklich" [Only those who are on television really exist], Wiener Journal, vol. 12
- Holl, Adolf, ed. (1993), Wie werden aus Monstren Menschen? [How do monsters become people?], Forum Stadtpark
- — (1993). Die Welt zum Narren halten Demut als Lebensprogramm [Fooling the world: Humility as a lifestyle] (in German). München: Kösel. ISBN 3-466-36393-4. OCLC 75441961.
- — (1993). In Gottes Ohr : siebzehn Ubungen in Kirchenkritik [In God's ear: Seventeen exercises in church criticism] (in German). Düsseldorf: Patmos Verlag. ISBN 3-491-72290-X. OCLC 30614282.
- — (1993). "Das erste Letzte Abendmahl" [The first last supper]. In Schultz, Uwe (ed.). Speisen, Schlemmen, Fasten: eine Kulturgeschichte des Essens [Eating, feasting, fasting: a cultural history of food] (in German). Frankfurt am Main: Insel. ISBN 978-3-458-16566-8. OCLC 29769139.
- — (1994). Die Ketzer: zur Pflege der Ketzergesinnung [The heretics: Maintaining the heretical attitude] (in German). Hoffmann und Campe. ISBN 3-455-08559-8. OCLC 32293774.
- Ley, Charlotte; Holl, Adolf; Lüthi, Kurt (1996). Auschwitz : Versuche einer Annäherung [Auschwitz: Attempts at rapprochement]. Österreichische Texte zur Gesellschaftskritik [Austrian texts on social criticism] (in German). Vienna: Verlag für Gesellschaftskritik. ISBN 3-85115-226-3. OCLC 36645107.
- — (1997). Die linke Hand Gottes : Biographie des Heiligen Geistes (in German). List. ISBN 3-471-79330-5. OCLC 39073012. Translated as The Left Hand of God: A Biography of the Holy Spirit. Doubleday. 1998. ISBN 978-0-385-49284-3.
- — (1997). Die religiöse Militanz und deren Begütigung : ein Beitrag zum humanwissenschaftlichen Realismus [Religious militancy and its satisfaction: A contribution to human scientific realism]. Wiener Vorlesungen im Rathaus [Vienna Lectures at City Hall] (in German). Vol. 22. Vienna: Picus Verlag. ISBN 3-85452-348-3. OCLC 37432952.
- — (2000). "Ein liebender Gott will keine Opfer! Sühne, Schuld und Scheitern sind nicht das Zentrum des Christentums, und Gott ist kein Sadist: Warum Jesus mit einem Opferlamm rein gar nichts zu tun hat" [A loving God does not want sacrifices! Atonement, guilt, and failure are not the center of Christianity, and God is not a sadist: Why Jesus has absolutely nothing to do with a sacrificial lamb]. Publik-Forum. 8: 24–26.
- — (2001). Gott ist tot und läßt Dich herzlich grüßen: eine Autobiographie [God is dead and greets you warmly: An autobiography] (in German). Ed. Va Bene. ISBN 978-3-85167-113-1.
- — (2002). Brief an die gottlosen Frauen [Letter to the godless women] (in German). Vienna: Paul Zsolnay. ISBN 3-552-05203-8. OCLC 50694574.
- — (2003). Weihrauch und Schwefel: ein Monolog [Frankincense and Sulfur: a Monologue] (in German). Graz: Styria. ISBN 3-222-12990-8. OCLC 52188597.
- — (2005). Die unheilige Kirche Geschlecht und Gewalt in der Religion [The unholy church: Gender and violence in religion] (in German). Stuttgart: Kreuz. ISBN 3-7831-2593-6. OCLC 181455940.
- — (2005), Der lachende Christus [The laughing Christ] (in German), Vienna: Paul Zsolnay, ISBN 978-3-552-05342-7, OCLC 58549262
- — (2006). Om & Amen eine universale Kulturgeschichte des Betens [Om & Amen: A universal cultural history of prayer] (in German). ISBN 978-3-579-06927-2. OCLC 180918787.
- Lehmann, Karl; Schönborn, Christoph von; Holl, Adolf; Küng, Hans (2007). "Jesus von Nazareth" kontrovers : Rückfragen an Joseph Ratzinger [The "Jesus of Nazareth" controversy: Questions for Joseph Ratzinger] (in German). ISBN 978-3-03735-174-1. OCLC 182526680.
- — (2008). "The Beyond of the theologians". Constructivist Foundations. 3 (3): 272ff.
- — (2009). Wie gründe ich eine Religion [How do I start a religion?] (in German). St. PöltenSalzburg: Residenz Verlag. ISBN 978-3-7017-1518-3. OCLC 314736795.
- — (18 March 2011). "Religion ist Krieg" [Religion is war]. Die Presse (in German). Vol. 19.
- — (2013). "Gott ist die Wahrheit oder Horváths Suche nach der zweiten religiösen Naivität" [God is Truth or Horváth's search for the second religious naivete]. In von Horváth, Ödön; Streitler-Kastberger, N. (eds.). Jugend ohne Gott [Youth without God]. Wiener Ausgabe sämtlicher Werke (in German). De Gruyter. pp. 147–156. ISBN 978-3-11-033778-5.
- — (2015). Braunau am Ganges (in German). Residenz Verlag. ISBN 978-3-7017-4501-2. ISBN 9783701733521
- — (2017), Mitleid: Plädoyer für ein unzeitgemäßes Gefühl [Compassion: a plea for an outdated feeling], Rowohlt Verlag
- — (May 2020). "Leibesvisitationen" [Body searches]. wespennest. Vol. 178. pp. 4–11.
