= Rektorenkonferenz der Schweizer Universitäten =

The Rektorenkonferenz der Schweizer Universitäten (CRUS; English: Rectors' Conference of the Swiss Universities) was an organization that represented universities in Switzerland. It began in 1904 as the Schweizerische Hochschulrektorenkonferenz (SHRK), becoming in 2001 the Rektorenkonferenz der Schweizer Universitäten. On January 1, 2015, the CRUS, along with the Rektorenkonferenz der Fachhochschulen der Schweiz (Rectors' Conference of Swiss Universities of Applied Sciences; KFH) and the Rektorenkonferenz der pädagogischen Hochschulen (Swiss Conference of Rectors of the Universities of Education; COHEP), merged to form the Rektorenkonferenz der schweizerischen Hochschulen (Rectors' Conference of Swiss Universities).

== Activities ==
The CRUS pursued the goal of promoting the common concerns of Swiss universities. Among other things, it encouraged coordination and cooperation in teaching, research, and educational services. Involved in all matters requiring mutual understanding or common opinion in higher education, it represented Swiss universities in political, business, cultural, and public arenas. The CRUS signed the Berlin Declaration on Open Access to Knowledge in the Sciences and Humanities in January 2006.

== See also ==
- List of universities in Switzerland
- Swissuniversities, successor to the CRUS
- Schweizerische Universitätskonferenz (SUK; Swiss University Conference)
