= Studyportals =

Dutch online education company

Studyportals B.V.
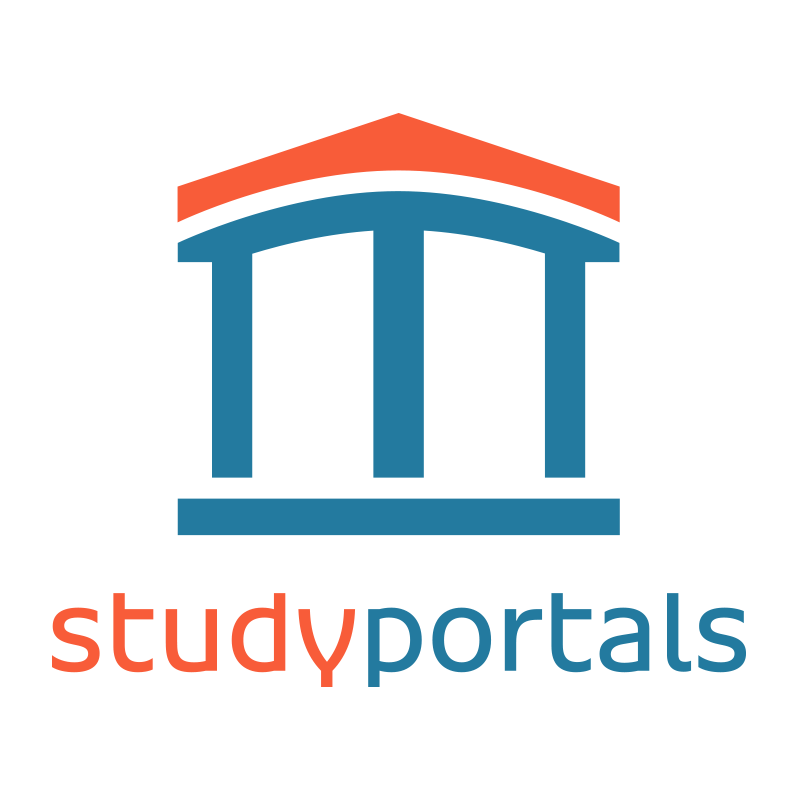
- Type: Private
- Industry: Higher Education; Online Marketing
- Founded: Eindhoven, Netherlands (2009)
- Key people: Edwin van Rest, CEO and co-founder
- Number of employees: > 300
- Website: www.studyportals.com

Studyportals B.V. is a Netherlands-based company that provides an online education choice platform, listing more than 200,000 undergraduate, postgraduate, distance learning, and preparation course programmes worldwide, along with other international education resources. They also have a scholarship listing portal, called Scholarshipportal, which enables students to search for scholarship options from institutions and organisations around the world. The company initially started as Mastersportal at the end of 2007 and has since expanded to Bachelorsportal, Mastersportal, PhDportal, Distancelearningportal and Shortcoursesportal. Studyportals has been part of several EU-funded projects in the field of higher education and regularly publishes reports about developments in the European higher education sector. According to their website, Studyportals has more than 36 million visitors per year.

== History ==
Mastersportal (which would later form the basis for Studyportals) started in 2007 as a spin-off from the international student organisation ESTIEM. Their members identified a massive information gap, wherein students struggled to find English-taught Master's degree options in Europe. This informational gap was especially pronounced following the Bologna Process - a process that resulted in a unification of higher education throughout Europe. In 2009, Studyportals B.V. was officially founded, undergoing several processes of professionalisation. In the same year, they won the Dutch New Venture award and managed to secure start-up venture capital.

Over the years, Studyportals continued to adjusted its business and marketing model. In 2011, Studyportals changed its university advertising model, one largely based upon a results-based system. By 2013, Studyportals defined its mission and core values, enabling them to hire colleagues and brand the company according to specific principles, values, and ideals.

In the years that followed, the company's platform continued to increase its popularity, becoming the European market leader for English-taught Master's programmes in 2009. As of October 2017, the company had over 180 employees, with offices in Bucharest, Boston, Melbourne, Manchester, Monterrey and while maintaining headquarters in Eindhoven.

== The Global Study Awards ==
In 2015 Studyportals, in cooperation with the ISIC Association and British Council launched The Global Study Awards. The award was introduced in order to support students who are interested in studying abroad and exploring new countries. Every year, applications for The Global Study Awards undergo 4 rounds of selection before two recipients are chosen at the final rounds. Eligible participants have the chance receive an award up to £10,000 that can be applied towards tuition fees, paid directly to the Higher Education Institution.

According to the ISIC Association, British Council, and Studyportals, they select candidates based on their "potential to contribute to society through their studies," their "commitment to developing their career", and their "sincere interest in increasing intercultural understanding and exchange".

== The League of Students ==
In 2016, Studyportals created the League of Students. This project is designed in order to create a community of international student ambassadors. These ambassadors are students who are enrolled at one of the top 500 universities in Europe, allowing them to represent Studyportals at their respective universities. Participating ambassadors write blogs, create videos, give tours of their universities, assist fellow students through Skype, and promote studying abroad through social media.

Each activity that an ambassador performs comes with a set of points he or she can receive. After a certain number of points, students are given a symbolic laurel along with a gift. Some students are even eligible for taking a Studyportals Road Trip.

In 2017, the League of Student Ambassadors held their first road trip, in which four ambassadors travelled to 5 cities around Europe as a reward for collecting points.

== Analytics & Consulting Team (ACT) ==
In 2015, Studyportals formed a data-driven consultancy team within the company. The Analytics & Consulting Team (ACT), offers comprehensive, data-driven research to universities worldwide; through market analyses, training, and insights, the ACT team is able to assist universities with student recruitment and international education.

== Awards ==
In 2014, Studyportals won the FD Gazellen Award for best International growth achievement in the Netherlands. The company was also honored as one of the fasted growing technology companies within the BENELUX during the Deloitte Fast50 Awards, having occupied place 7. With this result the study choice platform has also qualified for the international pendant, the Deloitte Fast500 EMEA, ending up on place 54 in this ranking.
