= Heuristic =

Problem-solving method

A heuristic or heuristic technique (problem solving, mental shortcut, rule of thumb) is any approach to problem solving that employs a pragmatic method that is not necessarily optimized, perfected, or rationalized, but is nevertheless "good enough" as an approximation or attribute substitution. Where finding an optimal solution is impossible or impractical, heuristic methods can be used to speed up the process of finding a satisfactory solution. Heuristics can be mental shortcuts that ease the cognitive load of making a decision.

Heuristic reasoning is often based on induction, or on analogy ... Induction is the process of discovering general laws ... Induction tries to find regularity and coherence ... Its most conspicuous instruments are generalization, specialization, analogy. [...] Heuristic discusses human behavior in the face of problems [... that have been] preserved in the wisdom of proverbs.

— George Pólya, How to Solve It

== Context ==
Gigerenzer & Gaissmaier (2011) state that sub-sets of strategy include heuristics, regression analysis, and Bayesian inference.

A heuristic is a strategy that ignores part of the information, with the goal of making decisions more quickly, frugally, and/or accurately than more complex methods...

— S. Chow, "Many Meanings of 'Heuristic'", The British Journal for the Philosophy of Science

Heuristics are strategies based on rules to generate optimal decisions, like the anchoring effect and utility maximization problem. These strategies depend on using readily accessible, though loosely applicable, information to control problem solving in human beings, machines and abstract issues. When an individual applies a heuristic in practice, it generally performs as expected. However it can alternatively create systematic errors.

The most fundamental heuristic is trial and error, which can be used in everything from matching nuts and bolts to finding the values of variables in algebra problems. In mathematics, some common heuristics involve the use of visual representations, additional assumptions, forward/backward reasoning and simplification.

Dual process theory concerns embodied heuristics.

== Heuristic rigour models ==
Lakatosian heuristics is based on the key term: Justification (epistemology).

=== One-reason decisions ===
One-reason decisions are algorithms that are made of three rules: search rules, confirmation rules (stopping), and decision rules

- Take-the-best heuristic – Decision-making strategy
- Hiatus heuristic: a "recency-of-last-purchase rule"
- Default effect – Tendency to accept the default option
- Priority heuristic – Decision strategy
- Take-the-first heuristic

=== Recognition-based decisions ===
A class whose function is to determine and filter out superfluous things.

- Recognition heuristic
- Fluency heuristic – Mental heuristic

=== Tracking heuristics ===
Tracking heuristics is a class of heuristics.

- Gaze heuristic
- Pointing and calling – Railway safety technique

=== Trade-off ===
- Trade-off – Situational decision
  - Tallying heuristic
  - Equality heuristic

=== Social heuristics ===
Social heuristics – Decision-making processes in social environments

- Imitation – Behaviour in which an individual observes and replicates another's behaviour
- Tit for tat – English saying meaning "equivalent retaliation"
- Wisdom of the crowd – Collective perception of a group of people

=== Epistemic heuristics ===
- Propositional attitude – Concept in epistemology
- Essence – That which makes or defines an entity
- Analysis – Process of understanding a complex topic or substance
- Falsifiability – Property of a statement that can be logically contradicted
- Hierarchy of evidence – Heuristic ranking science research results

=== Behavioral economics ===
- Affect heuristic – Mental shortcut based on emotion
- Feedback – Process where information about current status is used to influence future status
- Reinforcement – Consequence affecting an organism's future behavior
- Stimulus–response model – Conceptual framework in psychology

=== Others ===
- Satisficing – Cognitive heuristic of searching for an acceptable decision
- Representativeness heuristic – Tool for assisting judgement in uncertainty
- Availability heuristic – Bias towards recently acquired information
- Awareness – State of knowing or noticing something
- Base and superstructure – Concepts in Marxist theory
- Social organism – Model of social interactions
- Dialectic – Method of reasoning and philosophical argument
- Continuum limit – Continuum limit in lattice models
- Johari window – Technique in personality development
- Social rationality
- Desert (philosophy) – Condition of being deserving of something, whether good or bad
- Less-is-better effect – Cognitive bias
- Minimalist heuristic
- Unification of theories in physics – Idea of connecting all of physics into one set of equations
- Backward induction – Process of reasoning backwards in sequence

=== Meta-heuristic ===
- Optimality
  - Survival of the fittest – Phrase to describe the mechanism of natural selection
  - Mechanical equilibrium – When the net force on a particle is zero
  - Chemical equilibrium – When the ratio of reactants to products of a chemical reaction is constant with time
  - Homeostasis – State of steady internal conditions maintained by living things
  - Entropy – Property of a thermodynamic system

== History ==
George Polya studied and published on heuristics in 1945. Polya (1945) cites Pappus of Alexandria as having written a text that Polya dubs Heuristic. Pappus' heuristic problem-solving methods consist of analysis and synthesis.

=== Notable ===
==== Figures ====
- George Polya
- Herbert A. Simon
- Daniel Kahneman
- Amos Tversky
- Gerd Gigerenzer
- Judea Pearl
- Robin Dunbar
- David Perkins Page
- Herbert Spencer
- Charles Alexander McMurry
- Frank Morton McMurry
- Lawrence Zalcman
- Imre Lakatos
- William C. Wimsatt
- Alan Hodgkin
- Andrew Huxley

==== Works ====
- Meno
- How to solve it
- Mathematics and Plausible Reasoning

=== Contemporary ===
The study of heuristics in human decision-making was developed in the 1970s and the 1980s, by the psychologists Amos Tversky and Daniel Kahneman, although the concept had been originally introduced by the Nobel laureate Herbert A. Simon. Simon's original primary object of research was problem solving that showed that we operate within what he calls bounded rationality. He coined the term satisficing, which denotes a situation in which people seek solutions, or accept choices or judgements, that are "good enough" for their purposes although they could be optimised.

Rudolf Groner analysed the history of heuristics from its roots in ancient Greece up to contemporary work in cognitive psychology and artificial intelligence, proposing a cognitive style "heuristic versus algorithmic thinking", which can be assessed by means of a validated questionnaire.

=== Adaptive toolbox ===
The adaptive toolbox contains strategies for fabricating heuristic devices. The core mental capacities are recall (memory), frequency, object permanence, and imitation. Gerd Gigerenzer and his research group argued that models of heuristics need to be formal to allow for predictions of behavior that can be tested. They study the fast and frugal heuristics in the "adaptive toolbox" of individuals or institutions, and the ecological rationality of these heuristics; that is, the conditions under which a given heuristic is likely to be successful. The descriptive study of the "adaptive toolbox" is done by observation and experiment, while the prescriptive study of ecological rationality requires mathematical analysis and computer simulation. Heuristics – such as the recognition heuristic, the take-the-best heuristic and fast-and-frugal trees – have been shown to be effective in predictions, particularly in situations of uncertainty. It is often said that heuristics trade accuracy for effort but this is only the case in situations of risk. Risk refers to situations where all possible actions, their outcomes and probabilities are known. In the absence of this information, that is under uncertainty, heuristics can achieve higher accuracy with lower effort. This finding, known as a less-is-more effect, would not have been found without formal models. The valuable insight of this program is that heuristics are effective not despite their simplicity – but because of it. Furthermore, Gigerenzer and Wolfgang Gaissmaier found that both individuals and organisations rely on heuristics in an adaptive way.

=== Cognitive-experiential self-theory ===
Heuristics, through greater refinement and research, have begun to be applied to other theories, or be explained by them. For example, the cognitive-experiential self-theory (CEST) is also an adaptive view of heuristic processing. CEST breaks down two systems that process information. At some times, roughly speaking, individuals consider issues rationally, systematically, logically, deliberately, effortfully, and verbally. On other occasions, individuals consider issues intuitively, effortlessly, globally, and emotionally. From this perspective, heuristics are part of a larger experiential processing system that is often adaptive, but vulnerable to error in situations that require logical analysis.

=== Attribute substitution ===
In 2002, Daniel Kahneman and Shane Frederick proposed that cognitive heuristics work by a process called attribute substitution, which happens without conscious awareness. According to this theory, when somebody makes a judgement (of a "target attribute") that is computationally complex, a more easily calculated "heuristic attribute" is substituted. In effect, a cognitively difficult problem is dealt with by answering a rather simpler problem, without being aware of this happening. This theory explains cases where judgements fail to show regression toward the mean. Heuristics can be considered to reduce the complexity of clinical judgments in health care.

== Academic disciplines ==
=== Psychology ===
In psychology, heuristics are simple, efficient rules, either learned or inculcated by evolutionary processes. These psychological heuristics have been proposed to explain how people make decisions, come to judgements, and solve problems. These rules typically come into play when people face complex problems or incomplete information. Researchers employ various methods to test whether people use these rules. The rules have been shown to work well under most circumstances, but in certain cases can lead to systematic errors or cognitive biases.

=== Philosophy ===
A heuristic device is used when an entity X exists to enable understanding of, or knowledge concerning, some other entity Y.

A good example is a model that, as it is never identical with what it models, is a heuristic device to enable understanding of what it models. Stories, metaphors, etc., can also be termed heuristic in this sense. A classic example is the notion of utopia as described in Plato's best-known work, The Republic. This means that the "ideal city" as depicted in The Republic is not given as something to be pursued, or to present an orientation-point for development. Rather, it shows how things would have to be connected, and how one thing would lead to another (often with highly problematic results), if one opted for certain principles and carried them through rigorously.

Heuristic is also often used as a noun to describe a rule of thumb, procedure, or method. Philosophers of science have emphasised the importance of heuristics in creative thought and the construction of scientific theories. Seminal works include Karl Popper's The Logic of Scientific Discovery and others by Imre Lakatos, Lindley Darden, and William C. Wimsatt.

=== Law ===
In legal theory, especially in the theory of law and economics, heuristics are used in the law when case-by-case analysis would be impractical, insofar as "practicality" is defined by the interests of a governing body.

The present securities regulation regime largely assumes that all investors act as perfectly rational persons. In truth, actual investors face cognitive limitations from biases, heuristics, and framing effects. For instance, in all states in the United States the legal drinking age for unsupervised persons is 21 years, because it is argued that people need to be mature enough to make decisions involving the risks of alcohol consumption. However, assuming people mature at different rates, the specific age of 21 would be too late for some and too early for others. In this case, the somewhat arbitrary delineation is used because it is impossible or impractical to tell whether an individual is sufficiently mature for society to trust them with that kind of responsibility. Some proposed changes, however, have included the completion of an alcohol education course rather than the attainment of 21 years of age as the criterion for legal alcohol possession. This would put youth alcohol policy more on a case-by-case basis and less on a heuristic one, since the completion of such a course would presumably be voluntary and not uniform across the population.

The same reasoning applies to patent law. Patents are justified on the grounds that inventors must be protected so they have incentive to invent. It is therefore argued that it is in society's best interest that inventors receive a temporary government-granted monopoly on their idea, so that they can recoup investment costs and make economic profit for a limited period. In the United States, the length of this temporary monopoly is 20 years from the date the patent application was filed, though the monopoly does not actually begin until the application has matured into a patent. However, like the drinking age problem above, the specific length of time would need to be different for every product to be efficient. A 20-year term is used because it is difficult to tell what the number should be for any individual patent. More recently, some, including University of North Dakota law professor Eric E. Johnson, have argued that patents in different kinds of industries – such as software patents – should be protected for different lengths of time.

=== Artificial intelligence ===
The bias–variance tradeoff gives insight into describing the less-is-more strategy. A heuristic can be used in artificial intelligence systems while searching a solution space. The heuristic is derived by using some function that is put into the system by the designer, or by adjusting the weight of branches based on how likely each branch is to lead to a goal node.

=== Behavioural economics ===
Heuristics refers to the cognitive shortcuts that individuals use to simplify decision-making processes in economic situations. Behavioral economics is a field that integrates insights from psychology and economics to better understand how people make decisions.

Anchoring and adjustment is one of the most extensively researched heuristics in behavioural economics. Anchoring is the tendency of people to make future judgements or conclusions based too heavily on the original information supplied to them. This initial knowledge functions as an anchor, and it can influence future judgements even if the anchor is entirely unrelated to the decisions at hand. Adjustment, on the other hand, is the process through which individuals make gradual changes to their initial judgements or conclusions.

Anchoring and adjustment has been observed in a wide range of decision-making contexts, including financial decision-making, consumer behavior, and negotiation. Researchers have identified a number of strategies that can be used to mitigate the effects of anchoring and adjustment, including providing multiple anchors, encouraging individuals to generate alternative anchors, and providing cognitive prompts to encourage more deliberative decision-making.

Other heuristics studied in behavioral economics include the representativeness heuristic, which refers to the tendency of individuals to categorize objects or events based on how similar they are to typical examples, and the availability heuristic, which refers to the tendency of individuals to judge the likelihood of an event based on how easily it comes to mind.

== Stereotyping ==
Stereotyping is a type of heuristic that people use to form opinions or make judgements about things they have never seen or experienced. They work as a mental shortcut to assess everything from the social status of a person (based on their actions), to classifying a plant as a tree based on it being tall, having a trunk, and that it has leaves (even though the person making the evaluation might never have seen that particular type of tree before).

Stereotypes, as first described by journalist Walter Lippmann in his book Public Opinion (1922), are the pictures we have in our heads that are built around experiences as well as what we are told about the world.

== See also ==
- ACT-R – Software
- Algorithm – Sequence of operations for a task
- Applied epistemology – Application of epistemology in specific fields
- Branch and bound – Optimization by removing non-optimal solutions to subproblems
- Coherence (philosophical gambling strategy) – Thought experiment, to justify Bayesian probability
- Decision theory – Branch of applied probability theory
- Embodied cognition – Interdisciplinary theory
- Failure mode and effects analysis – Analysis of potential system failures
- Game theory – Mathematical models of strategic interactions
- Heuristic-systematic model of information processing – Dual-process theory of persuasion
- Heuristics in judgment and decision-making – Simple strategies or mental processes involved in making quick decisions
- Ideal type – Typological term
- List of biases in judgment and decision making
- Metalepsis – Figure of speech
- Methodic school – School of medicine in ancient Greece and Rome
- Necessity and sufficiency – Terms to describe a conditional relationship between two statements
- Neuroheuristics
- Nudge theory – Concept in behavioral economics, political theory and behavioral sciences
- Predictive coding – Theory of brain function
- Principle of good enough – Principle of social research
- Priority heuristic – Decision strategy
- Prospect theory – Theory of behavioral economics
- Rule-based system – Type of computer system
- Rule of inference – Method of deriving conclusions
- SCAMPER – Acronym for the creative development process proposed by Alex Faickney Osborn
- Situated cognition – Hypothesis that knowing is inseparable from doing
- Six Thinking Hats – 1985 book by Maltese Dr. Edward de Bono
- Social heuristics – Decision-making processes in social environments
- Subjective expected utility – Concept in decision theory
- Thought experiment – Hypothetical situation
- TRIZ – Problem-solving tools
- Tutorial – Type of educational intervention
