= Social heuristics =

Decision-making processes in social environments

Social heuristics are simple decision making strategies that guide people's behavior and decisions in the social environment when time, information, or cognitive resources are scarce. Social environments tend to be characterised by complexity and uncertainty, and in order to simplify the decision-making process, people may use heuristics, which are decision making strategies that involve ignoring some information or relying on simple rules of thumb.

The class of phenomena described by social heuristics overlap with those typically investigated by social psychology and game theory. At the intersection of these fields, social heuristics have been applied to explain cooperation in economic games used in experimental research. In the view of the field's academics, cooperation is typically advantageous in daily life, and therefore people develop a cooperation heuristic that gets applied even to one-shot anonymous interactions (the "social heuristics hypothesis" of human cooperation).

== Overview ==
=== Bounded rationality ===
In the decision-making process, optimisation is almost always intractable in any implementation, whether machine or neural. Because of this, defined parameters or boundaries must be implemented in the process in order to achieve an acceptable outcome. This method is known as applying bounded rationality, where an individual makes a collective and rational choice that considers "the limits of human capability to calculate, the severe deficiencies of human knowledge about the consequences of choice, and the limits of human ability to adjudicate among multiple goals". They are essentially incorporating a series of criteria, referred to as alternatives for choice. These alternatives are often not initially given to the decision maker, so a theory of search is also incorporated.

=== Heuristics ===
Heuristics are a common alternative, which can be defined as simple strategies for decision making where the actor only pays attention to key pieces of information, allowing the decision to be made quickly and with less cognitive effort.

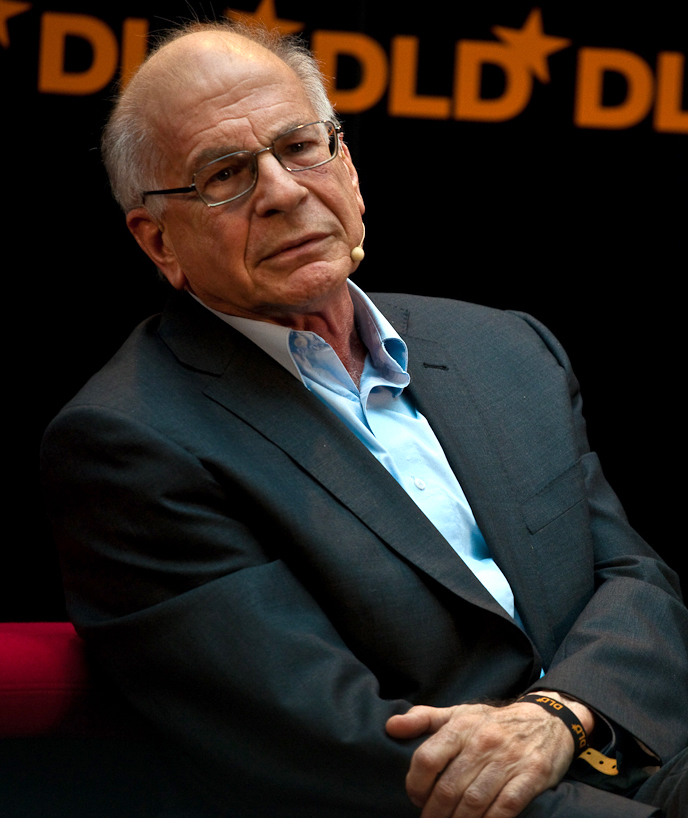
Israeli psychologist Daniel Kahneman was largely responsible for the advances made in understanding the psychology underpinning human decision making.

Daniel Kahneman and Shane Frederick have advanced the view that heuristics are decision-making processes that employ attribute substitution, where the decision maker substitutes the "target attribute" of the thing he is trying to judge with a "heuristic attribute" that more easily comes to mind. Shah and Daniel M. Oppenheimer have framed heuristics in terms of effort reduction, where the decision maker makes use of techniques that make decisions less effortful, such as only paying attention to some cues or only considering a subset of the available alternatives. Another view of heuristics comes from Gerd Gigerenzer and colleagues, who conceptualize heuristics as "fast and frugal" techniques for decision making that simplify complex calculations and make up part of the "adaptive toolbox" of human capacities for reasoning and inference. Under this framework, heuristics are ecologically rational, meaning a heuristic may be successful if the way it works matches the demands of the environment it is being used in. Researchers in this vein also argue that heuristics may be just as or even more accurate when compared to more complex strategies, such as multiple regression.

=== Social heuristics ===
Social heuristics can include heuristics that use social information, operate in social contexts, or both. Examples of social information include information about the behavior of a social entity or the properties of a social system, while nonsocial information is information about something physical. Contexts in which an organism may use social heuristics can include "games against nature" and "social games". In games against nature, the organism strives to predict natural occurrences (such as the weather) or competes against other natural forces to accomplish something. In social games, the organism is making decisions in a situation that involves other social beings. Importantly, in social games, the most adaptive course of action also depends on the decisions and behavior of the other actors. For instance, the follow-the-majority heuristic uses social information as inputs but is not necessarily applied in a social context, while the equity-heuristic uses non-social information but can be applied in a social context such as the allocation of parental resources amongst offspring.

Within social psychology, some researchers have viewed heuristics as closely linked to cognitive biases. Others have argued that these biases result from the application of social heuristics depending on the structure of the environment that they operate in. Researchers in the latter approach treat the study of social heuristics as closely linked to social rationality, a field of research that applies the ideas of bounded rationality and heuristics to the realm of social environments. Under this view, social heuristics are seen as ecologically rational. In the context of evolution, research utilizing evolutionary simulation models has found support for the evolution of social heuristics and cooperation when the outcomes of social interactions are uncertain.

== Examples ==
Examples of social heuristics include:

- Imitate-the-majority heuristic, also referred to follow-the-majority heuristic. An agent (or decision maker) using the heuristic would imitate the behavior of the majority of others in his reference group. For instance, in deciding which restaurant to choose, people tend to choose the one with the longer waiting queue.
- Imitate-the-successful heuristic, also referred to follow-the-best heuristic. An agent using the heuristic would imitate the behavior of the most successful person in her reference group.
- Equity heuristic, also referred to 1/N heuristic. Using the heuristic means equally distributing resources among the available options. The heuristic was found to be successful in the stock market and also been found to describe parental resource allocation decisions: parents typically allocate their time and effort equally amongst their children.
- Social-circle heuristic. The heuristic is used to infer which of two alternatives has the higher value. An agent using the heuristic would search through her social circles in order of their proximity to the self (self, family, friends, and acquaintances), stopping the search as soon as the number of instances of one alternative within a circle exceeds that of the other, choosing the alternative with the higher tally. For example, a person might decide which of two sports is more popular by thinking through how many members of each circle play each sport.
- Tit-for-Tat heuristic. In deciding whether to cooperate or defect, an agent using the heuristic would cooperate in the first round and in subsequent rounds, reciprocate his partner's action of cooperation or defection in the previous round. The heuristic is typically investigated using a prisoner's dilemma in game theory, where there is substantial evidence that people use such a heuristic, leading to intuitive reciprocation.
- Regret matching heuristic. An agent using this heuristic will persist with a course of action in a cooperative game as long as she is not experiencing regret. Once she experiences regret, this heuristic predicts a probability that the actor will switch her behavior that is proportional to the amount of regret she feels about missing out on a past payout.
- Group recognition heuristic, which extends principles related to the recognition heuristic into a group decision making setting. In individual decision making, the recognition heuristic is used when an individual asked which of two options has a higher value on a given criterion judges that the option he recognizes has a higher value than the option he does not recognize. This is applied in group decision making settings when a group's choice of which of two options has a higher value is influenced by use of the recognition heuristic by some members of the group.
- Majority heuristic (rule). This is a decision rule used in group decision making by both humans and animals, where each member of the group votes for an alternative and a decision is reached based on the option with the most votes. Researchers investigating majority rule (where the option with more than half of the votes is chosen) and plurality rule (where the option with the most votes in chosen) strategies for group decisions found such strategies to be both high-performing and computationally efficient for situations where there is a correct answer.
- Base-Rate heuristic. The process that involves using common mental shortcuts that help a decision to be made based on known probabilities. For example, if an animal is heard howling in a large city, it is usually assumed to be a dog because the probability that a wolf is in a large city is very low.
- Peak-and-end heuristic. When past experiences are practically exclusively judged on how the agent was affected at the peak (both unpleasant and pleasant) and the end of event, creating a natural bias in the decision-making process as the whole experience is not analysed.
- Familiarity heuristic. The agent's approach to solve a social decision in which they have experienced a similar event before involves them reflecting on comparable past situations, and often acting the same way they acted in the past.

== Relation to other concepts ==
=== Dual-process approach ===
A dual-process approach to human cognition specifies two types of thought processes: one that is fast and happens unconsciously or automatically, and another that is slower and involves more conscious deliberation. In the dominant dual-systems approach in social psychology, heuristics are believed to be automatically and unconsciously applied. The study of social heuristics as a tool of bounded rationality asserts that heuristics may be used consciously or unconsciously.

=== Social heuristics hypothesis ===
The social heuristics hypothesis is a theory put forth by Rand and colleagues that explains the link between intuition and cooperation. Under this theory, cooperating in everyday social situations tends to be successful, and as a result, cooperation is an internalized heuristic that is applied in unfamiliar social contexts, even those in which such behavior may not lead to the most personally advantageous result for the actor (such as a lab experiment).

Methods used by researchers to study cooperative behavior in the laboratory include economic games such as:

- Prisoner's dilemma game: two players each decide whether to cooperate or defect; a player who defects when the other cooperates maximizes his payout, if both cooperate the payout is higher than if both defect.
- Public goods game : multiple players each choose how much money to put towards a public project; the amount in the public pot is increased by a given factor and distributed equally to the players.
- Trust game: one player transfers money to another player and the money is increased by a given factor; the other then decides whether and how much to transfer back.
- Ultimatum game: one player makes an offer for how to split a resource with the other player; the other player can accept the offer (so that both players get the amount proposed by the split) or reject the offer (so that neither player gets anything).

These economic games all share the condition that, when played in a single round, an individual's payout is maximized if he acts selfishly and chooses not to cooperate. However, over the course of repeated rounds, cooperation can be payout maximizing and thus be a self-interested strategy.

Following a dual-process framework, the social heuristics hypothesis contends that cooperation, which is automatic and intuitive, may be overridden by reflection. The theory is supported by evidence from laboratory and online experiments suggesting that time pressure increases cooperation, though some evidence suggests this may be only among individuals who are not as familiar with the types of economic games typically used in this field of research.

Meta-analytic evidence based on 67 studies that looked at cooperation in the types of economic games described above suggests that cognitive-processing manipulations that encourage intuitive decision-making (such as time pressure or increased cognitive load) increase pure cooperation, where a one-shot action has no future consequences for the actor to consider and not cooperating is the most advantageous option. However, such manipulations do not have an effect on strategic cooperation in situations in which cooperation may be the pay-off maximizing option because of a possibility of future interactions where the actor may be rewarded for cooperation.

Importantly, research suggests that this intuitive cooperation may vary by culture and/or social roles. For instance, one study comparing participants from the US to participants from India found some differences in the patterns and speed of cooperation in online tasks across these groups, suggesting that cultural background may play a role in cooperative behavior. Another study comparing men to women found that promoting intuitive decision making increased cooperative behavior among women but not among men, and the authors link this result to social roles and norms that stereotype women as altruistic.

== See also ==
- Heuristics in judgment and decision-making
- Bounded rationality
