= Name recognition =

Voter ability to identify candidate

In politics, name recognition is the ability a voter has to identify a candidate's name due to a certain amount of previous exposure through various campaigning methods. It can be described as the awareness voters have about specific candidates resulting from various forms of campaign advertising. Some of the advertising methods to raise public awareness used by candidates running for various offices include: creating professional personal and ideological advertising, public service announcements, community work with target voter demographics and public appearances through mass media exposure. Though candidates can achieve high name recognition and exposure, this does not necessarily mean that the average voter has a good understanding of their ideology, positions and stances on political issues.

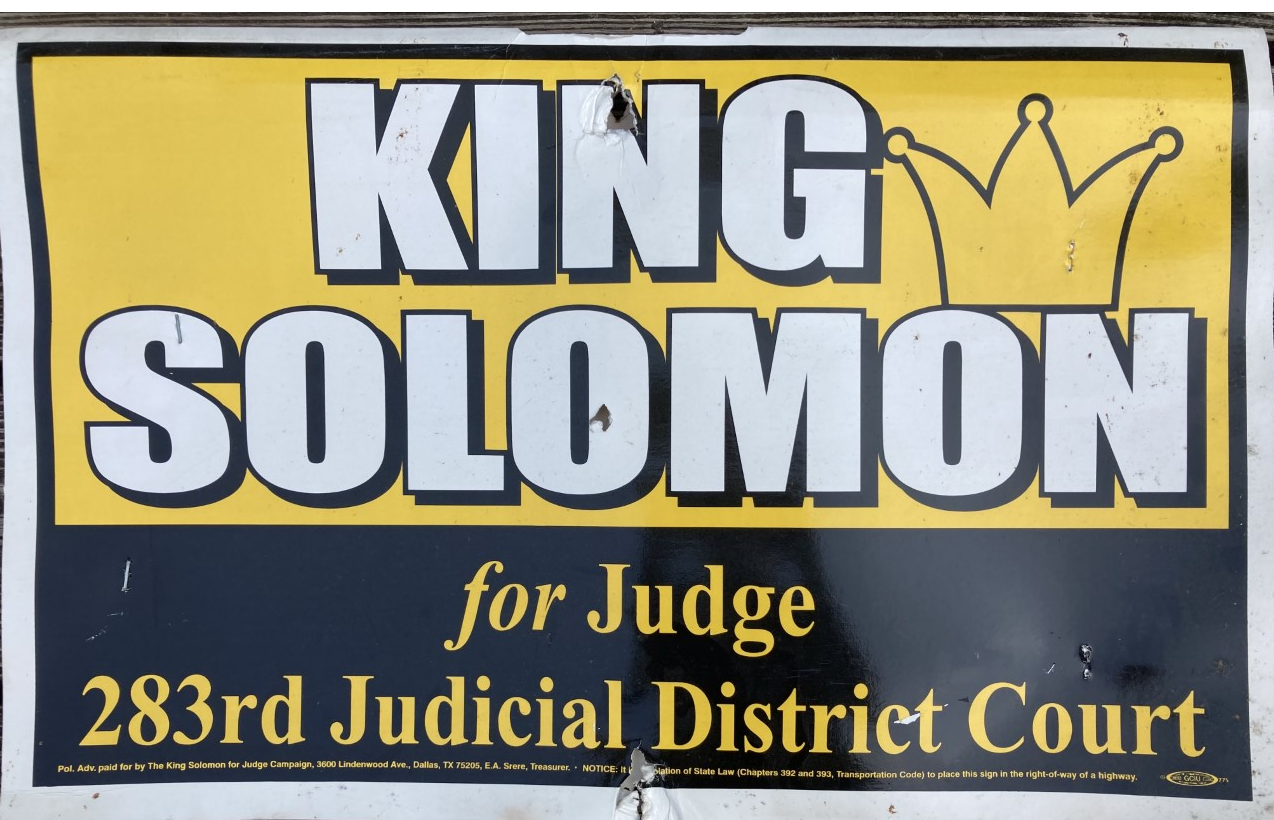
Association with recognizable name can lead to name recognition

== Effects ==
The ability of a citizen to recognize a candidate's name can impact the effect of their voting behavior and which candidates they select when casting their ballots. Exposure to a candidate's name, with or without the conscious awareness of the name recognition, can lead to an increase in the candidate's likability. One explanation for this is the recognition heuristic, when applied to voting behavior, which is the ability to recognize a political figure's name which leads the people to believe that they should support that specific candidate. The ability to recognize a candidate's name can occur consciously or subconsciously through various forms of subliminal messages and advertising. One of the reasons behind the reoccurring incumbency effect, or the constant trend of people re-electing politicians who currently hold the position up for election, is due to the effects of name recognition. According to a study performed in Name Recognition and Candidate Support by Cindy D. Kam and Elizabeth J. Zechmeister, after a three-day subliminal exposure to a candidate's name, there can be an increase in support for this politician. These reasons described are the factors that explain why politicians spend such large amounts of money and work very hard to make their names recognizable to the voting population. There are proven positive effects when name recognition of a candidate is accomplished.

== Online advertising ==
Online advertising is one popular method used by political campaigns in order to gain exposure and support. The benefits of using this form of advertising are that is a very low-cost method and it has the ability to reach a large number of people quickly. Also, using the current technology available enables these campaigns to have the ability to target specific people who have a higher chance of voting for them, by using factors such as race and age. Another advantage of using online political advertisements is that it is a very effective method of achieving a higher likelihood that the candidate's name will be recognized by a larger range of people. The online world and social media gives candidates the ability to gain a large amount of exposure and name recognition, which can increase the chances that they will win in the upcoming election. Even though using online advertisements is a sufficient method in reaching a large group, it does not guarantee a win because people are constantly exposed to various online advertisements, and often by opposing candidates, as well, during election season. This popular method of advertising is efficient, but has minimal effect.

== See also ==
- Availability heuristic
- Mere-exposure effect
