= Daniel Goldstein =

American cognitive psychologist

- Born: 1969 (age 56–57); United States
- Education: University of Wisconsin–Madison (BS); University of Chicago (PhD)
- Known for: Decision making heuristics
- Awards: Max Planck Institute Otto Hahn Medal (1997)
- Scientific career
- Fields: Psychology; Behavioral economics
- Workplaces: Microsoft Research London Business School; Columbia University Max Planck Institute
- Doctoral advisor: Gerd Gigerenzer
- Website: dangoldstein.com

Daniel G. Goldstein (born 1969) is an American cognitive psychologist known for the specification and testing of heuristics and models of bounded rationality in the field of judgment and decision making. He is a Partner Research Manager at Microsoft Research.

== Education ==
Goldstein received his Bachelor of Science degree in computer science from the University of Wisconsin–Madison in 1993 and a Ph.D. in cognitive psychology from the University of Chicago in 1997.

== Career ==
Goldstein and his doctoral advisor Gerd Gigerenzer started the Center for Adaptive Behavior and Cognition at the Max Planck Institute in Germany, where Goldstein worked as a research scientist for several years.

In 2002, Goldstein became associate director of the Center for the Decision Sciences at Columbia University before becoming an assistant professor of marketing at London Business School in 2005. In 2009, Goldstein accepted an offer as a principal research scientist at Yahoo! Research. In 2012, Goldstein was part of a group of Yahoo scientists who left en masse to found the New York City lab of Microsoft Research, where he is now Partner Research Manager.

Goldstein's doctoral thesis used computer simulation to study the accuracy and frugality of satisficing heuristics for making inferences. Investigations of the take-the-best heuristic and the recognition heuristic were later published as journal articles in Psychological Review and in the book Simple Heuristics That Make Us Smart. These fast and frugal heuristics have since had an impact in medicine, law and politics, and other areas outside psychology. With Eric J. Johnson, Goldstein authored an article on organ donation in the journal Science Along with Nobel Laureate William F. Sharpe, he created the Distribution Builder method for eliciting probability distributions. Hal Hershfield and Goldstein ran virtual reality experiments in which people saw renderings of themselves as senior citizens and increased their intentions to save for retirement, as discussed in Goldstein's TED talk The Battle Between Your Present and Future Self.

In 2014, Goldstein was elected president of the Society for Judgment and Decision Making.

== Notable contributions ==
- Recognition heuristic
- Take-the-best heuristic

== Selected publications (listed chronologically) ==
- Gigerenzer, G.; Goldstein, D. G. (1996). "Reasoning the fast and frugal way: Models of bounded rationality". Psychological Review. 103 (4): 650–669. doi:10.1037/0033-295X.103.4.650. hdl:21.11116/0000-0000-B771-2. PMID 8888650.
- Goldstein, D. G.; Gigerenzer, G. (2002). "Models of ecological rationality: The recognition heuristic". Psychological Review. 109 (1): 75–90. doi:10.1037/0033-295X.109.1.75. hdl:11858/00-001M-0000-0025-9128-B. PMID 11863042.
- Johnson, E. J.; Goldstein, D. G. (2003). "Do defaults save lives?". Science. 302 (5649): 1338–1339. doi:10.1126/science.1091721. PMID 14631022. S2CID 166476782.
- Goldstein, D. G.; Johnson, E. J.; Sharpe, W. F. (2008). "Choosing outcomes versus choosing products: Consumer-focused retirement investment advice". Journal of Consumer Research. 35 (3): 440–456. doi:10.1086/589562. S2CID 10083583.
- Hershfield, H.; Goldstein, D. G.; Sharpe, W. F.; Fox, J.; Yeykelis, L.; Carstensen, L. L.; Bailenson, J. N. (2011). "Increasing saving behavior through age-progressed renderings of the future self". Journal of Marketing Research. 48 (SPL): S23–S37. doi:10.1509/jmkr.48.SPL.S23. PMC 3949005. PMID 24634544.
- Goel, S.; Goldstein, D. G. (2014). "Predicting individual behavior with social networks". Marketing Science. 33 (1): 82–93. doi:10.1287/mksc.2013.0817.
- Goldstein, D. G.; Suri, S.; McAfee, R. P.; Ekstrand-Abueg, M.; Diaz, F. (2014). "The economic and cognitive costs of annoying display advertisements". Journal of Marketing Research. 51 (6): 742–752. doi:10.1509/jmr.13.0439. S2CID 866397.
- Goldstein, D.; Hershfield, H. E.; Benartzi, S. (2016). "The illusion of wealth and its reversal". Journal of Marketing Research. 53 (5): 804–813. doi:10.1509/jmr.14.0652. S2CID 51779359.
