= RAS model =

RAS model may refer to:

- Reliability, availability and serviceability, a computer hardware engineering term originally used by IBM
- John Zaller's "Receive-Accept-Sample" model, propounded in his book The Nature and Origins of Mass Opinion
