= John Zaller =

Political scientist

John R. Zaller
- Born: 1949 (age 76–77)
- Education: University of California, Berkeley
- Scientific career
- Fields: Political science
- Workplaces: University of California, Los Angeles
- Doctoral advisor: Nelson W. Polsby

John Raymond Zaller (born 1949) is a political scientist and professor specializing in public opinion at the University of California, Los Angeles. He was an Editor of the American Political Science Review. He graduated from Saint Monica Catholic High School in Santa Monica, CA. He pursued his undergraduate studies at the University of California, Riverside. He received his Ph.D. from the University of California, Berkeley in 1984.

== Career ==
Zaller is best known for his 1992 book The Nature and Origins of Mass Opinion, in which he argues that changes in public opinion are due to the influences of political elites. Although he acknowledges the mainstream media's shortcomings, Zaller holds a positive view of "infotainment", arguing that even sensationalist and superficial media coverage of politics serves to inform and does increase awareness of political issues. Zaller teaches undergraduate classes on electoral politics and the mass media's influence on public opinion in election cycles as well as graduate classes on political behavior and intermediate statistical analysis.

In a joint article with Stanley Feldman, Zaller also developed a theory of how individuals respond to survey questions on political issues, which suggested that most individuals hold multiple and conflicting "considerations" about a given issue, and as such, people respond to survey questions on the basis of "top-of-the-head" ideas at the moment of answering. This theory, according to Zaller and Feldman, explains why individuals often are inconsistent in their response patterns across questions and over time.

Zaller is a part of the UCLA School of Political Parties, which holds that political parties are created by intense policy demanders, rather than by ambitious politicians.

== List of works ==
- The Party Decides: Presidential Nominations Before and After Reform, 2008, with Marty Cohen, David Karol and Hans Noel. University of Chicago Press.
- The Nature and Origins of Mass Opinion, 1992, Cambridge University Press.
- The American Ethos, Public Attitudes Toward Capitalism and Democracy, 1984, with Herbert McCloskey, Harvard University Press.

Zaller has also authored numerous academic articles.

== Bibliography ==
- Cohen, Marty; Karol, David; Noel, Hans; Zaller, John (2008). The Party Decides: Presidential Nominations Before and After Reform. Chicago: University of Chicago Press.
- The Nature and Origins of Mass Opinion New York: Cambridge University Press (summary)
- "Who Gets the News: Measuring Individual Differences in Likelihood of News Reception" with Vincent Price. Public Opinion Quarterly 1993.
