= UCLA School of Political Parties =

The UCLA School of Political Parties is a school of thought that contends that political parties are created by the policy demands of groups in society. It is so named because many of its proponents studied at or are faculty members in UCLA's political science department. The school's views contrast with the view that policy outcomes are secondary or subordinate to the goal of winning office. Their view can be seen in the book The Party Decides: Presidential Nominations Before and After Reform by Martin Cohen, David Karol, Hans Noel and John Zaller, and in an article in Perspectives by Kathleen Bawn, Cohen, Karol, Seth Masket, Noel and Zaller.

The school builds on earlier theories by E.E. Schattschneider, Joseph Schumpeter and others.

Three arguments typify works by the school:

1. Parties are created by "intense policy demanders," who are groups who want specific policies from government. These groups coordinate with other groups to win control of office so as to get their policy goals.
2. Parties are informal organizations. Elected office-holders are not more important than unelected policy demanders.
3. Policy demanders control politics by nominating candidates with whom they agree.

The school has become influential in the study of political parties in the United States. The article in Perspectives on Politics, "A Theory of Political Parties: Groups, Policy Demands and Nominations in American Politics", won the Heinz I Eulau Award for best article in Perspectives from the American Political Science Association in 2013. It later won the Jack Walker Award for best article on political parties from the Political Organizations and Parties Section of APSA in 2014.

== Bibliography ==
- Bawn, Kathy, Marty Cohen, David Karol, Seth Masket, Hans Noel and John R. Zaller. 2012. "A Theory of Political Parties: Groups, Policy Demands and Nominations in American Politics." Perspectives on Politics 10(3):571-597.
- Cohen, Marty, David Karol, Hans Noel and John Zaller. 2008. The Party Decides: Presidential Nominations Before and After Reform. Chicago: University of Chicago Press.
- Karol, David. 2009. Party Position Change in American Politics: Coalition Management. New York: Cambridge University Press.
- Masket, Seth. 2009. No Middle Ground: How Informal Party Organizations Control Nominations and Polarize Legislatures. Ann Arbor: The University of Michigan Press.
- Masket, Seth. and Hans Noel. 2012. "Serving Two Masters: Using Referenda to Assess Partisan versus Dyadic Legislative Representation." Political Research Quarterly
