= Social rationality =

In behavioural sciences, social rationality is a type of decision strategy used in social contexts, in which a set of simple rules is applied in complex and uncertain situations.

Social rationality is a form of bounded rationality applied to social contexts, where individuals make choices and predictions under uncertainty. While game theory deals with well-defined situations, social rationality explicitly deals with situations in which not all alternatives, consequences, and event probabilities can be foreseen. The idea is that, similar to non-social environments, individuals rely, and should rely, on fast and frugal heuristics in order to deal with complex and genuinely uncertain social environments. This emphasis on simple rules in an uncertain world contrasts with the view that the complexity of social situations requires highly sophisticated mental strategies, as has been assumed in primate research and neuroscience, among others.

== A descriptive and normative program ==
Social rationality is both a descriptive program and a normative program. The descriptive program studies the repertoire of heuristics an individual or organization uses, that is, their adaptive toolbox. The normative program studies the environmental conditions to which a heuristic is adapted, that is, where it performs better than other decision strategies. This approach is called the study of the ecological rationality of social heuristics. It assumes that social heuristics are domain- and problem-specific.

== Applications ==
Heuristics can be applied to social and non-social decision tasks (also called social games and games against nature), judgments, or categorizations. They can use social or non-social input. Social rationality is thus about three of the four possible combinations, excluding the case of heuristics using non-social input for non-social tasks. 'Games against nature' comprise situations where individuals face environmental uncertainty, and need to predict or outwit nature, e.g., harvest food or master hard-to-predict or unpredictable hazards. 'Social games' include situations, where the decision outcome depends on the choices of others, e.g., in cooperation, competition, mate search and even in morally significant situations.

Social rationality has been studied in a number of other fields than human decision-making, e.g. in evolutionary social learning, and social learning in animals.

=== Examples ===
==== Imitate-the-majority heuristic ====
An example for a heuristic that is not necessarily social but that requires social input is the imitate-the-majority heuristic, where in a situation of uncertainty, individuals follow the actions or choices of the majority of their peers regardless of their social status. The domain of pro-environmental behavior provides numerous illustrations for this strategy, such as littering behavior in public places, the reuse of towels in hotel rooms, and changes in private energy consumption in response to information about the consumption of the majority of neighbors.

==== 1/N (Equality heuristic) ====
Following the equality heuristic (sometimes called 1/N rule) people divide and invest their resources equally in a number of N different options. These options can be both social (e.g., time spent with children) and nonsocial entities (e.g., financial investments or natural resources). For example, many parents invest their limited resources, such as affection, time, and money (e.g., for education) equally into their offspring. In highly uncertain environments with large numbers of assets and only few possibilities to learn, the equality heuristic can outperform optimizing strategies and yield better performance on various measures of success than optimal asset allocation strategies.

== Social heuristics ==
Adapted from Hertwig & Herzog, 2009.

- Imitate-the-majority heuristic
- Social circle heuristic
- Averaging heuristic
- Tit-for-tat
- Generous tit-for-tat (or tit-for-two-tat)
- Status tree
- Regret matching heuristic
- Mirror heuristic
- 1/N (Equality heuristic)
- Group recognition heuristic
- White coat heuristic/ Trust your doctor heuristic
- Imitate-the-successful heuristic
- Plurality vote-based lexicographic heuristic

== See also ==
- Social heuristics
- Ecological rationality
- Optimization
- Risk
- Uncertainty
- Max Planck Institute for Human Development
