= Gerd Gigerenzer =

German psychologist (born 1947)

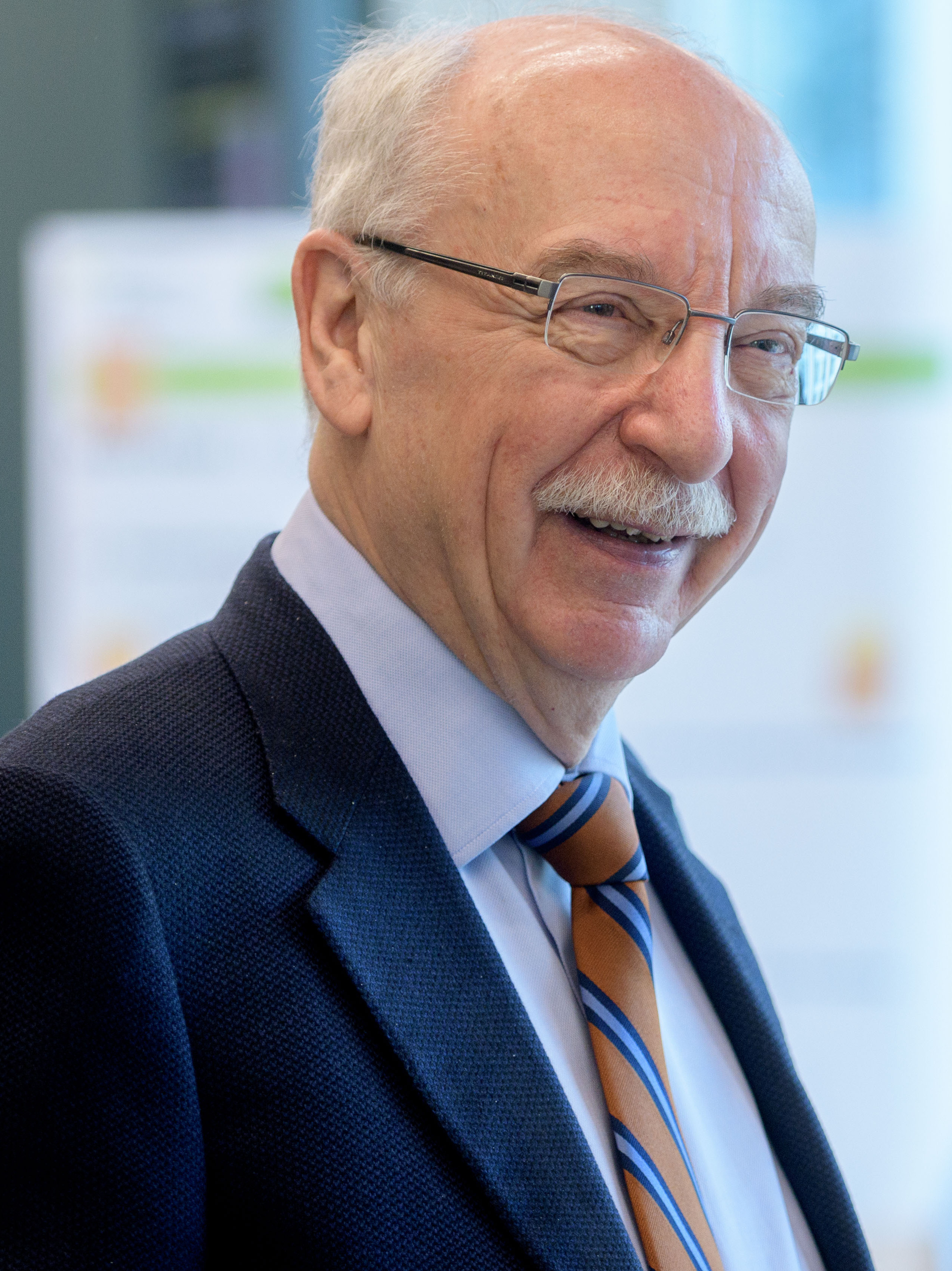
- Gigerenzer in 2018
- Born: September 3, 1947 (age 79); Wallersdorf, Germany
- Education: LMU Munich (MA, PhD)
- Known for: Adaptive toolbox
- Spouse: Lorraine Daston
- Children: Thalia Gigerenzer
- Awards: AAAS Prize for Behavioral Science Research (2008); German Psychology Prize (2011); Communicator Award of the German Research Association (DFG) (2011)
- Scientific career
- Fields: Psychology; Decision theory
- Workplaces: Max Planck Institute for Human Development (Director since 1997); Harding Center for Risk Literacy (Director since 2008)
- Thesis: Nonmetrische multidimensionale Skalierung als Modell des Urteilverhaltens (German) (1977)
- Doctoral students: Daniel Goldstein
- Website: www.gerd-gigerenzer.com

Gerd Gigerenzer (German: [ˈɡiːɡəˌʁɛntsɐ]; born 3 September 1947) is a German psychologist who has studied the use of bounded rationality and heuristics in decision making. Gigerenzer is director emeritus of the Center for Adaptive Behavior and Cognition (ABC) at the Max Planck Institute for Human Development, Berlin, director of the Harding Center for Risk Literacy, University of Potsdam, and vice president of the European Research Council (ERC).

Gigerenzer investigates how humans make inferences about their world with limited time and knowledge. He proposes that, in an uncertain world, probability theory is not sufficient; people also use smart heuristics, that is, rules of thumb. He conceptualizes rational decisions in terms of the adaptive toolbox (the repertoire of heuristics an individual or institution has) and the ability to choose a good heuristics for the task at hand. A heuristic is called ecologically rational to the degree that it is adapted to the structure of an environment.

Gigerenzer argues that heuristics are not irrational or always second-best to optimization, as the accuracy-effort trade-off view assumes, in which heuristics are seen as short-cuts that trade less effort for less accuracy. In contrast, his and associated researchers' studies have identified situations in which "less is more", that is, where heuristics make more accurate decisions with less effort. This contradicts the traditional view that more information is always better or at least can never hurt if it is free. Less-is-more effects have been shown experimentally, analytically, and by computer simulations.

== Biography ==
=== Early life ===
Gerd Gigerenzer was born on 3 September 1947 in Wallersdorf, Germany.

=== Education ===
Gigerenzer received a Master of Arts and a Doctor of Philosophy in psychology from LMU Munich in 1974 and 1977, respectively. He received the postdoctoral degree of habilitation (full professor qualification) at LMU's department of psychology in 1982.

=== Academic career ===
Previously working at LMU Munich, Gigerenzer moved to the University of Konstanz in 1984 and to the University of Salzburg in 1990. From 1992 to 1995, he was Professor of Psychology at the University of Chicago and has been the John M. Olin Distinguished Visiting Professor, School of Law at the University of Virginia. In 1995, he became director of the Max Planck Institute for Psychological Research in Munich, and in 1997 director of the Max Planck Institute for Human Development in Berlin. Since 2009, he has been director of the Harding Center for Risk Literacy in Berlin, which moved in 2020 to the University of Potsdam.

He is a member of the Science Council of the ERC, the 22 scientists who oversee the European Research Council, and since 2023, Vice President of the ERC.

=== Heuristics ===
Gigerenzer argues that heuristic reasoning should not lead us to conceive of human thinking as riddled with irrational cognitive biases, but rather to conceive rationality as an adaptive tool that is not identical to the rules of formal logic or of probability calculus. This is in contrast to other leading experts on cognitive heuristics such as Daniel Kahneman and Amos Tversky. He and his collaborators have theoretically and experimentally shown that many behavioral patterns claimed to demonstrate cognitive fallacies are better understood as adaptive responses to a world of uncertainty, including the conjunction fallacy, the base rate fallacy, and overconfidence.

With Daniel Goldstein he first theorized the recognition heuristic and the take-the-best heuristic. They proved analytically conditions under which semi-ignorance (lack of recognition) can lead to better inferences than with more knowledge. These results were experimentally confirmed in many experiments, e.g., by showing that semi-ignorant people who rely on recognition are as good as or better than the Association of Tennis Professionals (ATP) Rankings and experts at predicting the outcomes of the Wimbledon tennis tournaments. Similarly, decisions by experienced experts (e.g., police, professional burglars, airport security) were found to follow the take-the-best heuristic rather than weight and add all information, while inexperienced students tend to do the latter.

A third class of heuristics, fast-and-frugal trees, are designed for categorization and are used for instance in emergency units to predict heart attacks or to model bail decisions made by magistrates in London courts. In such applications, the risks are not knowable and professionals hence face uncertainty. To better understand the logic of fast-and-frugal trees and other heuristics, Gigerenzer and his colleagues use the strategy of mapping their patterns into well-understood optimization theories, such as signal-detection theory. The short book Classification in the Wild (2020, MIT Press), uses examples such as how American citizens decide to vote for their president or how paramedics prioritise treatments at a medical emergency to show how to build heuristics such as fast-and-frugal trees and tallying models. The book also shows how to test and compare these simple heuristics' accuracy and transparency with state-of-the art algorithms from other fields, including machine learning.

=== The adaptive toolbox ===
The basic idea of the adaptive toolbox is that different domains of thought require different specialized cognitive mechanisms instead of one universal strategy. The analysis of the adaptive toolbox and its evolution is descriptive research with the goal of specifying the core cognitive capacities (such as recognition memory) and the heuristics that exploit these (such as the recognition heuristic).

=== Risk communication ===
Alongside his research on heuristics, Gigerenzer investigates risk communication in situations where risks can actually be calculated or precisely estimated. He has developed an ecological approach to risk communication where the key is the match between cognition and the presentation of the information in the environment. For instance, lay people as well as professionals often have problems making Bayesian inferences, typically committing what has been called the base-rate fallacy in the cognitive illusions literature. Gigerenzer and Ulrich Hoffrage were the first to develop and test a representation called natural frequencies, which helps people make Bayesian inferences correctly without any outside help. Later it was shown that with this method, even 4th graders were able to make correct inferences. Once again, the problem is not simply in the human mind, but in the representation of the information. Gigerenzer has taught risk literacy to some 1,000 doctors in their CMU and some 50 US federal judges, and natural frequencies has now entered the vocabulary of evidence-based medicine. In recent years, medical schools around the world have begun to teach tools such as natural frequencies to help young doctors understand test results.

== Intellectual background ==
Intellectually, Gigerenzer's work is rooted in Herbert Simon's work on satisficing (as opposed to maximizing) and on ecological and evolutionary views of cognition, where adaptive function and success is central, as opposed to logical structure and consistency, although the latter can be means towards function.

Gigerenzer and colleagues have written of the mid-17th century "probabilistic revolution", "the demise of the dream of certainty and the rise of a calculus of uncertainty – probability theory". Gigerenzer has called for a second revolution, "replacing the image of an omniscient mind computing intricate probabilities and utilities with that of a bounded mind reaching into an adaptive toolbox filled with fast and frugal heuristics". These heuristics may equip humans to deal with the many situations they face in which not all alternatives and probabilities are known, and surprises can happen.

== Personal life ==
Gigerenzer is married to Lorraine Daston, director at the Max Planck Institute for the History of Science and has one daughter, Thalia Gigerenzer.

Gigerenzer is a jazz and Dixieland musician. He was part of The Munich Beefeaters Dixieland Band which performed in a TV ad for the VW Golf around the time it came out in 1974. The ad can be viewed on YouTube, with Gigerenzer at the steering wheel and on the banjo.

== Awards ==
- AAAS Prize for Behavioral Science Research for the best article in the behavioral sciences.
- The Association of American Publishers Prize for the best book in the social and behavioral sciences.
- The German Psychology Prize
- The Communicator Award of the German Research Association. (DFG)
- Swiss Duttweiler Institute top-100 Global Thought Leaders worldwide.
- Doctor Honoris Causa, University of Basel
- Doctor Honoris Causea, the University of Southampton.
- Fellow of the Berlin-Brandenburg Academy of Sciences.
- Fellow of the German Academy of Sciences Leopoldina.
- International Fellow of the British Academy.
- International Member of the American Academy of Arts and Sciences and the American Philosophical Society.

== Publications ==
=== Books (selection) ===
- Reb, J., Luan, S., & Gigerenzer, G. (2024). Smart management: How simple heuristics help leaders make good decisions in an uncertain world. MIT Press.
- Gigerenzer, G., Mousavi, S., & Viale, R. (Eds.) (2024). Elgar Companion to Herbert Simon. Edward Elgar.
- Gigerenzer, G. (2023). The intelligence of intuition. Cambridge University Press.
- Gigerenzer, G. (2022). How to stay smart in a smart world: Why human intelligence still beats algorithms. Penguin.
- Bauer, T. K., Gigerenzer, G., Krämer, W., & Schüller, K. (2022). Grüne fahren SUV und Joggen macht unsterblich. Campus Verlag.
- Katsikopoulos, K., Şimşek, Ö., Buckmann, M., & Gigerenzer, G. (2020). Classification in the wild. MIT Press.
- Gigerenzer, G. (2015). Simply rational: Decision making in the real world. Oxford University Press.
- Bauer, T. K., Gigerenzer, G., & Krämer, W. (2014). Warum dick nicht doof macht und Genmais nicht tötet: Über Risiken und Nebenwirkungen der Unstatistik. Campus Verlag.
- Gigerenzer, G. (2014). Risk savvy: How to make good decisions. Viking.
- Gigerenzer, G., Hertwig, R., & Pachur, T. (Eds.) (2011). Heuristics: The foundations of adaptive behavior. Oxford University Press.
- Gigerenzer, G. (2008). Rationality for mortals: How people cope with uncertainty. Oxford University Press.
- Gigerenzer, G. (2007). Gut feelings: The intelligence of the unconscious. Viking Press.
- Gigerenzer, G. (2002). Calculated risks: How to know when numbers deceive you. Simon & Schuster.
- Gigerenzer, G., & Selten, R. (Eds.). (2001). Bounded rationality: The adaptive toolbox. MIT Press.
- Gigerenzer, G., Todd, P. M., & the ABC Research Group. (1999). Simple heuristics that make us smart. Oxford University Press.
- Gigerenzer, G., Swijtink, Z., Porter, T., Daston, L., Beatty, J., & Krüger, L. (1989). The empire of chance. How probability changed science and everyday life. Cambridge University Press.
- Gigerenzer, G., & Murray, D. J. (1987). Cognition as intuitive statistics. Erlbaum.

=== Journal articles (selection) ===
- Gigerenzer, G., Reb, J., & Luan, S. (2022). Smart heuristics for individuals, teams, and organizations. Annual Review of Organizational Psychology and Organizational Behavior, 9, 171–198. doi:10.1146/annurev-orgpsych-012420-090506
- Gigerenzer, G. (2022). Simple heuristics to run a research group. PsyCH Journal, 11, 275–280. doi:10.1002/pchj.533
- Artinger, F., Gigerenzer, G. & Jacobs, P. (2022). Satisficing: Integrating two traditions. Journal of Economic Literature, 60, 598–635.
- Gigerenzer, G., Multmeier, J., Föhring, A., & Wegwarth, O. (2021). Do children have Bayesian intuitions? Journal of Experimental Psychology: General, 50, 1041–1070. doi:10.1037/xge0000979
- Gigerenzer, G. (2018). The bias bias in behavioral economics. Review of Behavioral Economics, 5, 303–336. doi:10.1561/105.00000092
- Gigerenzer, G. (2018). Statistical rituals: The replication delusion and how we got there. Advances in Methods and Practices in Psychological Science, 1, 198–218. doi:10.1177/2515245918771329
- Gigerenzer, G. (2017). A theory integration program. Decision, 4, 133–145.
- Gigerenzer, G., & Garcia-Retamero, R. (2017). Cassandra’s regret. The psychology of not wanting to know. Psychological Review, 124, 179–196. doi:10.1037/rev0000055
- Arkes, H. R., Gigerenzer, G., & Hertwig, R. (2016). How bad is incoherence? Decision, 3, 20–39.
- Luan, S., Schooler, L., & Gigerenzer, G. (2011). A signal detection analysis of fast-and-frugal trees. Psychological Review, 118, 316–338. doi:10.1037/a0022684
- Gigerenzer, G., & Gaissmaier, W. (2011). Heuristic decision-making. Annual Review of Psychology, 62. 451–482. doi:10.1146/annurev-psych-120709-145346
- Gigerenzer, G. (2010). Moral satisficing. Rethinking moral behavior as bounded rationality. Topics in Cognitive Science, 2, 528–554. doi:10.1111/j.1756-8765.2010.01094.x
- Gigerenzer, G., & Brighton, H. (2009). Homo heuristicus: Why biased minds make better inferences. Topics in Cognitive Science, 1, 107–143. doi:10.1111/j.1756-8765.2008.01006.x
- Gigerenzer, G., Gaissmaier, W., Kurz-Milcke, E., Schwartz, L. M., & Woloshin, S. W. (2007). Helping doctors and patients make sense of health statistics. Psychological Science in the Public Interest, 8, 53–96.
- Gigerenzer, G. (2006). Out of the frying pan into the fire: Behavioral reactions to terrorist attacks. Risk Analysis, 26, 347–351.
- Gigerenzer, G. (2004). Mindless statistics. Journal of Socio-Economics, 33, 587–606.

== Videos ==
- TEDx Talk: Risk literacy
- TEDx Talk: How do smart people make smart decisions?
- TED-Ed Why do people fear the wrong things?
- Gerd Gigerenzer & Nicholas Taleb: The dichotomy of behavioral economics.

== See also ==
- Bias–variance tradeoff
- Cognitive bias
- Conjunction fallacy
- Frequency format hypothesis
- Heuristics in judgment and decision-making
- Great Rationality Debate
- Rationality
  - Bounded rationality
  - Ecological rationality
  - Social rationality
