= The Nature and Origins of Mass Opinion =

1992 book by John Zaller

- Author: John Zaller
- Language: English
- Publisher: Cambridge University Press
- Publication date: 1992-08-28
- Pages: 381
- ISBN: 978-0-521-40786-1
- OCLC: 25050973
- Dewey Decimal: 303.3/8 20
- LC Class: HM261 .Z35 1992

The Nature and Origins of Mass Opinion is a 1992 non-fiction book by political scientist John Zaller that examines the processes by which individuals form and express political opinions and the implications this has for public opinion research. The book has been called "the single most important book on public opinion since V. O. Key's 1961 classic, Public Opinion and American Democracy."

Zaller argues that public opinion is heavily influenced by exposure to elite discourse on political matters. He attributes variation in political attitudes between individuals to individual-level differences in receptivity to this discourse, in terms of political awareness (i.e., does an individual receive political messages from elites?) and concordance with prior beliefs (i.e., do the messages received conform to an individual’s basic political values?).

By rejecting the notion that voters hold single preferences (or, in fact, that individuals possess structured belief systems from which they can derive policy preferences), the book challenges the usefulness of public opinion surveys. Zaller’s argument as to how individuals form survey responses is effectively summarized by his "Receive-Accept-Sample" (RAS) model, according to which the opinions individuals express reflect the messages they have received (contingent on the degree of political awareness), accepted (contingent on consistency with prior beliefs), and sampled from (contingent on what issues hold priority at that moment).

Politically more aware individuals are more likely to pick up ("receive") elite messages. They are also, due to their exposure to multiple and often conflicting messages, less likely to accept messages that are inconsistent with their prior attitudes (i.e., they are more selective). Less aware individuals receive fewer messages, but are more likely to accept them (even if they are conflicting). Thus, Zaller argues, there is a positive correlation between political awareness and the consistency and stability of political opinions.

Following the RAS model, political opinion surveys are not valid measures of public opinion as they do not measure an individual’s "true preferences" or capture an individual's pre-existing opinions (as Zaller argues they don't pre-exist firmly for most people), but instead the balance of considerations that are most salient to the person surveyed at that particular instant. In Zaller’s words, "most of what gets measured as public opinion does not exist except in the presence of a pollster".

In a subsequent article, Zaller backtracks from his argument in The Nature and Origins of Mass Opinion and maintains that the influence elites exercise over public opinion is less than he had originally claimed. He writes:

However poorly informed, psychologically driven, and "mass-mediated" public opinion may be, it is capable of recognizing and focusing on its own conception of what matters.

== Theoretical framework of the RAS model ==
The first three chapters of the book lay out the theoretical framework of Zaller's "Receive-Accept-Sample" (RAS) model.

Ch1. Introduction: The fragmented state of opinion research

The book's objective is to explain how individuals process information to formulate their opinion. It also aims to propose a model that helps generalize and simplify the then fragmented field of public opinion.

Zaller's RAS model is grounded in four key points about how people respond to public opinion surveys.

1. People have various levels of awareness of current affairs
2. People are able to react to issues critically only if they have high levels of awareness of the issues
3. People don't hold fixed thoughts in their head awaiting pollsters to collect their answers. Instead, they react to survey questions on the fly, forming temporary "opinion statements"
4. People answer questions based on what's most available to them

Ch2. Information, predispositions, and opinion

What is the nature of the information the public receives? Zaller argues that people receive, be it directly or indirectly, political information from elites. The elites frame current events using already available stereotypes to engage with the public. Information disseminated to the public is an elite discourse and is hardly neutral. While the elite discourse shapes public opinion, it does not dictates it solely.

What are the other factors shaping public opinion?

- Political awareness: Zaller defines it as "the extent to which an individual pays attention to politics and understands what he or she has encountered." People's political awareness is generally low but it varies significantly among individuals. People with different levels of political awareness react to elite discourse differently. Depending on an issue, some are more susceptible to the elite discourse than others. Zaller suggests public opinion researchers could measure one's political awareness using a series of fact-based questions.
- Political predispositions: Zaller defines them as "stable, individual-level traits that regulate the acceptance or non-acceptance of the political communications the person receives". He highlights the need to take political awareness into account in the study of political predispositions. Political awareness is necessary to provide the contextual information one needs to translate their values to an opinion. To capture respondent's predispositions, Zaller suggests asking domain specific value questions is preferable to a question mapping one's political ideology.

What are the problems with surveys that researchers use for measuring public opinion?

- Over time instability mainly comes from the fact people don't have strong opinions about issues surveyed, but still try to choose between given options. In essence, people choose an option at random. Some scholars challenge this argument saying that the instability comes from a measurement error. Respondents find it difficult to map their pre-existing opinions onto vaguely phrased questions. Zaller rejects this thought because he finds attributing big changes in people's attitudes over time to a measurement error is unconvincing.
- Error due to response effects: It means a systematic error introduced when respondents respond to a survey. It is introduced due to the context in which a question is asked. This type of error can be caused by question wording or question order. Different wording or order activates different frames. Respondents then react to the frames activated rather than the substantive content of a question.

What do these two survey problems suggest?

These problems are indicators that respondents don't necessarily bring their pre-existing opinions to the table because for many they don't even have one in the first place. The response they offer is a "temporary construction" of their opinions, which Zaller calls them "opinion statements". These statements are constructed based on frames which are made most available to them at the time. This view also explains over time instability. The instability is due to changes in the most salient frames among the elite discourse. Therefore, the model Zaller proposes argues that people respond to a question by averaging a non-random sample of frames.

Ch3. How citizens acquire information and convert it into public opinion

Zaller starts with defining "considerations" and "political messages".

"Considerations" are reasons for one to be for or against an issue. It takes into account of cognition and affect.

There are two types of "political messages".

- Persuasive messages: They are arguments for a certain point of view. When a message is adopted, it becomes a consideration.
- Cueing messages: They carry "contextual information" to activate one's predispositions to adopt or reject a message.

Zaller introduces four axioms that form the foundation of the RAS model.

1. Reception axiom: People with high political attentiveness are more likely to receive (encounter and understand) political messages about a political issue.
  - This has a heavier stress on cognitive engagement than emotional engagement. But emotional engagement is an important function especially when coupled with cognition.
  - Zaller suggests that measuring domain specific awareness is preferable to general awareness.
2. Resistance axiom: People who could derive contextual information from a message to work out the relationship with their predispositions are more likely to reject than accept the message.
  - What factors determine the ease of deriving contextual information? Political attentiveness and clarity of a message. When contextual information provided is obscure (either because an issue is unfamiliar or because of vague question wording), political awareness plays a more important role in assisting people to work out the linkage with their predisposition than in circumstances where contextual information is readily available.
  - Credibility of a source is often used as a proxy for providing contextual information to those who feel the issue has little impact on themselves, like political issues to many.
3. Accessibility axiom: More recent considerations are more likely to be retrieve in memory for use to interpret the messages given.
4. Response axiom: People average the considerations made available to them when responding to a survey.

Zaller sums these four axioms up in his "Receive-Accept-Sample" (RAS) model. To form an "opinion statement", people receive information on an issue, decide to accept it or not, and to sample considerations they could retrieve at the moment.
