= Neuroheuristics =

Neuroheuristics (or neuristics) studies the dynamic relations within neuroscientific knowledge, using a transdisciplinary studies approach. It was proposed by Alessandro Villa in 2000.

== Etymology ==
The word comes from the Greek νεύρον (neuron, which refers to the nerve cell) and εύρισκω ("euriskein", heuristic, which refers to problem-solving procedures characterized by informal, intuitive and speculative features).

== Paradigm ==
Neuroheuristics defines a scientific paradigm aimed to develop strategies that can be enabled to understand brain and mind following subsequent problems emerging from transdisciplinary studies including philosophy, psychology, neuroscience, pharmacology, physics, artificial intelligence, engineering, computer science, economics and mathematics.

The research framework introduced by the neuroheuristic paradigm appears as an essential step for the investigation of the information processing effected by the brain because it is the outcome of nature and nurture, at the crossing of top-down and bottom-up design.

Neurobiologists apply a bottom-up research strategy in their studies. This strategy has been able to describe a simple organism's nervous system, such as Caenorhabditis elegans. However, it would be impossible to simultaneously examine all neurons and all variables. This limits the value experimentation using this method could provide.

The top-down strategy with the assistance of black box theory appears easier to complete, but inappropriate for understanding the mechanisms which coordinate neurons.

The paradigm offers a needed and possibly distinct approach to the study of brain and mind.

In this framework, a result cannot be simply positive or negative because the process itself cannot be reduced to proficiency as such. Dynamics is an essential feature of the neuroheuristic paradigm, but it is more than just the neurobiological facet of holism as opposed to reductionism.
