= Hans Noel =

Hans C. Noel (born November 3, 1971) is an American political scientist.

He is an associate professor at Georgetown University's Department of Government.

Noel graduated from Northwestern University 1994 with a bachelor's degree in journalism. He pursued graduate studies at UCLA's Department of Political Science (M.A. 1999, Ph.D. 2006).

Noel was a fellow in the Center for the Study of Democratic Politics in the Woodrow Wilson School of Public and International Affairs at Princeton University. From 2008 to 2010, Noel was a Robert Wood Johnson Scholar in Health Policy Research at the University of Michigan.

Noel is a part of the UCLA School of Political Parties, which holds that political parties are created by intense policy demanders, rather than by ambitious politicians.

== Publications ==
- Noel, Hans (2013). Political Ideologies and Political Parties in America. New York: Cambridge University Press.
- Noel, Hans (2013). "Which Long Coalition: The Creation of the Anti-Slavery Coalition". Party Politics. 19 (6): 962–984. doi:10.1177/1354068811436031. S2CID 15728430.
- Noel, Hans (2012). "The Coalition Merchants: The Ideological Roots of the Civil Rights Realignment". Journal of Politics. 74 (1): 156–173. doi:10.1017/S0022381611001186. S2CID 154090941.
- Cohen, Marty; Karol, David; Noel, Hans; Zaller, John (2008). The Party Decides: Presidential Nominations Before and After Reform. Chicago: University of Chicago Press.
