= Recognition heuristic =

The recognition heuristic, originally termed the recognition principle, has been used as a model in the psychology of judgment and decision making and as a heuristic in artificial intelligence. The goal is to make inferences about a criterion that is not directly accessible to the decision maker, based on recognition retrieved from memory. This is possible if recognition of alternatives has relevance to the criterion. For two alternatives, the heuristic is defined as:

If one of two objects is recognized and the other is not, then infer that the recognized object has the higher value with respect to the criterion.

The recognition heuristic is part of the "adaptive toolbox" of "fast and frugal" heuristics proposed by Gigerenzer and Goldstein. It is one of the most frugal of these, meaning it is simple or economical. In their original experiment, Daniel Goldstein and Gerd Gigerenzer quizzed students in Germany and the United States on the populations of both German and American cities. Participants received pairs of city names and had to indicate which city has more inhabitants. In this and similar experiments, the recognition heuristic typically describes about 80–90% of participants' choices, in cases where they recognize one but not the other object (see criticism of this measure below). Surprisingly, American students scored higher on German cities, while German participants scored higher on American cities, despite only recognizing a fraction of the foreign cities. This has been labeled the "less-is-more effect" and mathematically formalized.

== Domain specificity ==
The recognition heuristic is posited as a domain-specific strategy for inference. It is ecologically rational to rely on the recognition heuristic in domains where there is a correlation between the criterion and recognition. The higher the recognition validity α for a given criterion, the more ecologically rational it is to rely on this heuristic and the more likely people will rely on it. For each individual, α can be computed by

α = C/(C+W)

where C is the number of correct inferences the recognition heuristic would make, computed across all pairs in which one alternative is recognized and the other is not, and W is the number of wrong inferences. Domains in which the recognition heuristic was successfully applied include the prediction of geographical properties (such as the size of cities, mountains, etc.), of sports events (such as Wimbledon and soccer championships) and elections. Research also shows that the recognition heuristic is relevant to marketing science. Recognition based heuristics help consumers choose which brands to buy in frequently purchased categories. A number of studies addressed the question of whether people rely on the recognition heuristic in an ecologically rational way. For instance, name recognition of Swiss cities is a valid predictor of their population (α = 0.86) but not their distance from the center of Switzerland (α = 0.51). Pohl reported that 89% of inferences accorded with the model in judgments of population, compared to only 54% in judgments of the distance. More generally, there is a positive correlation of r = 0.64 between the recognition validity and the proportion of judgments consistent with the recognition heuristic across 11 studies. Another study by Pachur suggested that the recognition heuristic is more likely a tool for exploring natural rather than induced recognition (i.e. not provoked in a laboratory setting) when inferences have to be made from memory. In one of his experiments, the results showed that there was a difference between participants in an experimental setting vs. a non-experimental setting.

== Less-is-more effect ==
If α > β, and α, β are independent of n, then a less-is-more effect will be observed. Here, β is the knowledge validity, measured as C/(C+W) for all pairs in which both alternatives are recognized, and n is the number of alternatives an individual recognizes. A less-is-more effect means that the function between accuracy and n is inversely U-shaped rather than monotonically increasing. Some studies reported less-is-more effects empirically among two, three, or four alternatives and in group decisions), whereas others failed to do so, possibly because the effect is predicted to be small (see Katsikopoulos).

Smithson explored the "less-is-more effect" (LIME) with the recognition heuristic and challenges some of the original assumptions. The LIME occurs when a "recognition-dependent agent has a greater probability of choosing the better item than a more knowledgeable agent who recognizes more items." A mathematical model is used in describing the LIME and Smithson's study used it and attempted to modify it. The study was meant to mathematically provide an understanding of when the LIME occurs and explain the implications of the results. The main implication is "that the advantage of the recognition cue depends not only on the cue validities, but also on the order in which items are learned".

== Neuropsychological evidence ==
The recognition heuristic can also be depicted using neuroimaging techniques. A number of studies have shown that people do not automatically use the recognition heuristic when it can be applied, but evaluate its ecological validity. It is less clear, however, how this evaluation process can be modeled. A functional magnetic resonance imaging study tested whether the two processes, recognition and evaluation, can be separated on a neural basis. Participants were given two tasks; the first involved only a recognition judgment ("Have you ever heard of Modena? Milan?"), while the second involved an inference in which participants could rely on the recognition heuristic ("Which city has the larger population: Milan or Modena?"). For mere recognition judgments, activation in the precuneus, an area that is known from independent studies to respond to recognition confidence, was reported. In the inference task, precuneus activation was also observed, as predicted, and activation was detected in the anterior frontomedian cortex (aFMC), which has been linked in earlier studies to evaluative judgments and self-referential processing. The aFMC activation could represent the neural basis of this evaluation of ecological rationality.

Some researchers have used event-related potentials (ERP) to test psychological mechanisms behind the recognition heuristic. Rosburg, Mecklinger, and Frings used a standard procedure with a city-size comparison task, similar to that used by Goldstein and Gigerenzer. They used ERP and analyzed familiarity-based recognition occurring 300-450 milliseconds after stimulus onset in order to predict the participants' decisions. Familiarity-based recognition processes are relatively automatic and fast so these results provide evidence that simple heuristics like the recognition heuristic utilize basic cognitive processes.

== Controversies ==
Research on the recognition heuristic has sparked a number of controversies.

=== Trade-offs ===
The recognition heuristic is a model that relies on recognition only. This leads to the testable prediction that people who rely on it will ignore strong, contradicting cues (i.e., do not make trade-offs; so-called noncompensatory inferences). In an experiment by Daniel M. Oppenheimer participants were presented with pairs of cities, which included actual cities and fictional cities. Although the recognition heuristic predicts that participants would judge the actual (recognizable) cities to be larger, participants judged the fictional (unrecognizable) cities to be larger, showing that more than recognition can play a role in such inferences.

Newell & Fernandez performed two experiments to try to test the claims that the recognition heuristic is distinguished from availability and fluency through binary treatment of information and inconsequentiality of further knowledge. The results of their experiments did not support these claims. Newell & Fernandez and Richter & Späth tested the non-compensatory prediction of the recognition heuristic and stated that "recognition information is not used in an all-or-none fashion but is integrated with other types of knowledge in judgment and decision making."

A reanalysis of these studies at an individual level, however, showed that typically about half of the participants consistently followed the recognition heuristic in every single trial, even in the presence of up to three contradicting cues. Furthermore, in response to those criticisms, Marewski et al. pointed out that none of the studies above formulated and tested a compensatory strategy against the recognition heuristic, leaving the strategies that participants relied on unknown. They tested five compensatory models and found that none could predict judgments better than the simple model of the recognition heuristic.

=== Measurement ===
One major criticism of studies on the recognition heuristic that was raised was that mere accordance with the recognition heuristic is not a good measure of its use. As an alternative, Hilbig et al. proposed to test the recognition heuristic more precisely devised a multinomial processing tree model for the recognition heuristic. A multinomial processing tree model is a simple statistical model often used in cognitive psychology for categorical data. Hilbig et al. claimed that a new model of recognition heuristic use was needed due to the confound between recognition and further knowledge. The multinomial processing tree model was shown to be effective and Hilbig et al. claimed that it provided an unbiased measure of the recognition heuristic.

Pachur stated that it is an imperfect model but currently it is still the best model to predict people's recognition-based inferences. He believes that precise tests have a limited value basically because certain aspects of the recognition heuristic are often ignored and so the results could be inconsequential or misleading.

=== Intuitive strategy ===
Hilbig et al. state that heuristics are meant to reduce effort and that the recognition heuristic reduces effort in making judgments by relying on one single cue and ignoring other information. In their study, they found that the recognition heuristic is more useful in deliberate thought than in intuitive thought. This means it is more useful when thoughts are intentional and not impulsive as opposed to intuitive thought, which is based more on impulse rather than conscious reasoning. In contrast, a study by Pachur and Hertwig found that it is actually the faster responses that are more in line with the recognition heuristic. Also, judgments accorded more strongly with the recognition heuristic under time pressure. In line with these findings, neural evidence suggests that the recognition heuristic may be relied upon by default.

== Support ==
Goldstein and Gigerenzer state that due to its simplicity, the recognition heuristic shows to what degree and in what situations behavior can be predicted. Some researchers suggest that the idea of the recognition heuristic should be retired but Pachur believes that a different approach should be taken in testing it. There are some researchers who believe that the recognition heuristic should be investigated using precise tests of the exclusive use of recognition.

Another study by Pachur suggested that the recognition heuristic is more likely a tool for exploring natural rather than induced recognition (i.e. not provoked in a laboratory setting) when inferences have to be made from memory. In one of his experiments, the results showed that there was a difference between participants in an experimental setting vs. a non-experimental setting.

== Synopsis ==
Using an adversarial collaboration approach, three special issues of the open access journal Judgment and Decision Making have been devoted to unravel the support for and problems with the recognition heuristic, providing the most recent and comprehensive synopsis of the epistemic status quo. In their Editorial to Issue III, the three guest editors strive for a cumulative theory integration.
