= Bounded rationality =

Making of satisfactory, not optimal, decisions

Bounded rationality is the idea that rationality is limited when individuals make decisions, and under these limitations, rational individuals will select a decision that is satisfactory rather than optimal.

Limitations include the difficulty of the problem requiring a decision, the cognitive capability of the mind, and the time available to make the decision. Decision-makers, in this view, act as satisficers, seeking a satisfactory solution, with everything that they have at the moment rather than an optimal solution. Therefore, humans do not undertake a full cost-benefit analysis to determine the optimal decision, but rather, choose an option that fulfills their adequacy criteria.

Some models of human behavior in the social sciences assume that humans can be reasonably approximated or described as rational entities, as in rational choice theory or Downs' political agency model. The concept of bounded rationality complements the idea of rationality as optimization, which views decision-making as a fully rational process of finding an optimal choice given the information available. Therefore, bounded rationality can be said to address the discrepancy between the assumed perfect rationality of human behaviour (which is utilised by other economics theories), and the reality of human cognition. In short, bounded rationality revises notions of perfect rationality to account for the fact that perfectly rational decisions are often not feasible in practice because of the intractability of natural decision problems and the finite computational resources available for making them. The concept of bounded rationality continues to influence (and be debated in) different disciplines, including political science, economics, psychology, law, philosophy, and cognitive science.

== Background and motivation ==
Bounded rationality was coined by Herbert A. Simon, where it was proposed as an alternative basis for the mathematical and neoclassical economic modelling of decision-making, as used in economics, political science, and related disciplines. Many economics models assume that agents are on average rational, and can in large quantities be approximated to act according to their preferences in order to maximise utility. With bounded rationality, Simon's goal was "to replace the global rationality of economic man with a kind of rational behavior that is compatible with the access to information and the computational capacities that are actually possessed by organisms, including man, in the kinds of environments in which such organisms exist." Soon after the term bounded rationality appeared, studies in the topic area began examining the issue in depth. A study completed by Maurice Allais in 1953 began to generate ideas of the irrationality of decision making as he found that given preferences, individuals will not always choose the most rational decision and therefore the concept of rationality was not always reliable in economic predictions.

In Models of Man, Simon argues that most people are only partly rational, and are irrational in the remaining part of their actions. In another work, he states "boundedly rational agents experience limits in formulating and solving complex problems and in processing (receiving, storing, retrieving, transmitting) information". Simon used the analogy of a pair of scissors, where one blade represents "cognitive limitations" of actual humans and the other the "structures of the environment", illustrating how minds compensate for limited resources by exploiting known structural regularity in the environment.

Simon describes a number of dimensions along which classical models of rationality can be made somewhat more realistic, while remaining within the vein of fairly rigorous formalization. These include:

- limiting the types of utility functions
- recognizing the costs of gathering and processing information
- the possibility of having a vector or multi-valued utility function

Simon suggests that economic agents use heuristics to make decisions rather than a strict rigid rule of optimization. They do this because of the complexity of the situation. An example of behaviour inhibited by heuristics can be seen when comparing the cognitive strategies utilised in simple situations (e.g. tic-tac-toe), in comparison to strategies utilised in difficult situations (e.g. chess). Both games, as defined by game theory economics, are finite games with perfect information, and therefore equivalent. However, within chess, mental capacities and abilities are a binding constraint, therefore optimal choices are not a possibility. Thus, in order to test the mental limits of agents, complex problems, such as those within chess, should be studied to test how individuals work around their cognitive limits, and what behaviours or heuristics are used to form solutions

Anchoring and adjustment heuristics give some explanation to bounded rationality and why decision makers do not make rational decisions. A study undertaken by Zenko et al. showed that the amount of physical activity completed by decision makers was able to be influenced by anchoring and adjustment as most decision makers would typically be considered irrational and would unlikely do the amount of physical activity instructed and it was shown that these decision makers use anchoring and adjustment to decide how much exercise they will complete.

Other heuristics that are closely related to the concept of bounded rationality include the availability heuristic and representativeness heuristic. The availability heuristic refers to how people tend to overestimate the likelihood of events that are easily brought to mind, such as vivid or recent experiences. This can lead to biased judgments based on incomplete or unrepresentative information. The representativeness heuristic states that people often judge the probability of an event based on how closely it resembles a typical or representative case, ignoring other relevant factors like base rates or sample size.

=== Examples ===
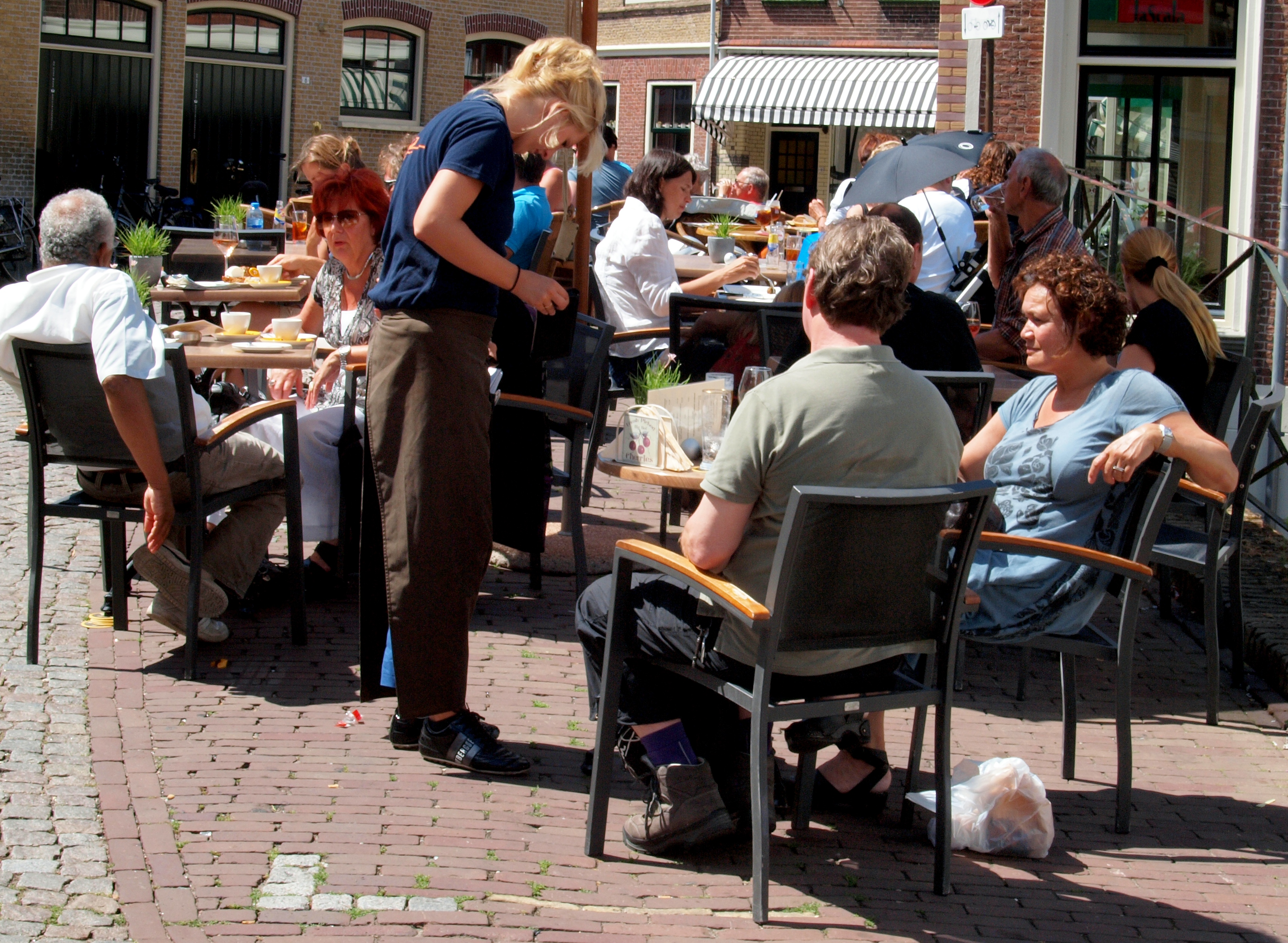

Bounded rationality can have significant effects on political decision-making, voter behavior, and policy outcomes. A prominent example of this is heuristic-based voting. According to the theory of bounded rationality, individuals have limited time, information, and cognitive resources to make decisions. In the context of voting, this means that most voters cannot realistically gather and process all available information about candidates, issues, and policies. Even if such information were available, the time and effort required to analyze it would be prohibitively high for many voters. As a result, voters often resort to heuristics, which allow voters to make decisions based on cues like party affiliation, candidate appearance, or single-issue positions, rather than engaging in a comprehensive evaluation of all relevant factors. For example, a voter who relies on the heuristic of party affiliation may vote for a candidate whose policies do not actually align with their interests, simply because the candidate belongs to their preferred party.

== Model extensions ==
As decision-makers have to make decisions about how and when to decide, Ariel Rubinstein proposed to model bounded rationality by explicitly specifying decision-making procedures as decision-makers with the same information are also not able to analyse the situation equally thus reach the same rational decision. Rubinstein argues that consistency in reaching final decision for the same level of information must factor in the decision making procedure itself. Gerd Gigerenzer stated that decision theorists, to some extent, have not adhered to Simon's original ideas. Rather, they have considered how decisions may be crippled by limitations to rationality, or have modeled how people might cope with their inability to optimize. Gigerenzer proposes and shows that simple heuristics often lead to better decisions than theoretically optimal procedures. Moreover, Gigerenzer claimed, agents react relative to their environment and use their cognitive processes to adapt accordingly.

Huw Dixon later argued that it may not be necessary to analyze in detail the process of reasoning underlying bounded rationality. If we believe that agents will choose an action that gets them close to the optimum, then we can use the notion of epsilon-optimization, which means we choose our actions so that the payoff is within epsilon of the optimum. If we define the optimum (best possible) payoff as $U^*$, then the set of epsilon-optimizing options $S(\epsilon)$ can be defined as all options $s$ such that:
$$U(s) \geq U^* - \epsilon.$$

From a computational point of view, decision procedures can be encoded in algorithms and heuristics. Edward Tsang argues that the effective rationality of an agent is determined by its computational intelligence. Everything else being equal, an agent that has better algorithms and heuristics could make more rational (closer to optimal) decisions than one that has poorer heuristics and algorithms. And many artificial intelligence systems show that strategic use of more computationally intensive inference can optimize performance at lower resource cost.

Tshilidzi Marwala and Evan Hurwitz in their study on bounded rationality observed that advances in technology (e.g. computer processing power because of Moore's law, artificial intelligence, and big data analytics) expand the bounds that define the feasible rationality space. Because of this expansion of the bounds of rationality, machine automated decision making makes markets more efficient.

The model of bounded rationality also extends to bounded self-interest, in which humans are sometimes willing to forsake their own self-interests for the benefits of others due to incomplete information that the individuals have at the time being. This is something that had not been considered in earlier economic models.

The theory of rational inattention, an extension of bounded rationality, studied by Christopher Sims, found that decisions may be chosen with incomplete information as opposed to affording the cost to receive complete information. This shows that decision makers choose to endure bounded rationality.

Using the concept of an "adaptive toolbox," a repertoire of fast and frugal rules for decision making under uncertainty, the work by Gerd Gigerenzer and colleagues on ecological rationality views bounded rationality neither as optimization under constraints nor as the study of people's reasoning fallacies. The strategies in the adaptive toolbox apply to situations where optimization and, for the most part, calculations of probabilities and utilities are not feasible. Ecological rationality explores when social norms, imitation, and other cultural tools function as rational strategies and shows how smart heuristics can exploit the structure of real decision-making environments.

== Behavioral economics ==
Bounded rationality attempts to address assumption points discussed within neoclassical economics theory during the 1950s. This theory assumes that the complex problem, the way in which the problem is presented, all alternative choices, and a utility function, are all provided to decision-makers in advance, where this may not be realistic. This was widely used and accepted for a number of decades, however economists realised some disadvantages exist in utilising this theory. This theory did not consider how problems are initially discovered by decision-makers, which could have an impact on the overall decision. Additionally, personal values, the way in which alternatives are discovered and created, and the environment surrounding the decision-making process are also not considered when using this theory. Alternatively, bounded rationality focuses on the cognitive ability of the decision-maker and the factors which may inhibit optimal decision-making. Additionally, placing a focus on organisations rather than focusing on markets as neoclassical economics theory does, bounded rationality is also the basis for many other economics theories (e.g. organisational theory) as it emphasises that the "...performance and success of an organisation is governed primarily by the psychological limitations of its members..." as stated by John D.W. Morecroft (1981).

One concept closely related to the idea of bounded rationality is nudging. The connection between nudging and bounded rationality lies in the fact that nudges are designed to help people overcome the cognitive limitations and biases that arise from their bounded rationality. Nudging involves designing choice architectures that guide people towards making better decisions without limiting their freedom of choice. The concept was popularized by Richard Thaler and Cass Sunstein in their 2008 book "Nudge: Improving Decisions About Health, Wealth, and Happiness."

One way nudges are used is with the aim of simplifying complex decisions by presenting information in a clear and easily understandable format, reducing the cognitive burden on individuals. Nudges can also be designed to counteract common heuristics and biases, such as the default bias (people's tendency to stick with the default option). For example, with adequate other policies in place, making posthumous organ donation the default option with an opt-out provision has been shown to increase actual donation rates. Moreover, in cases where the information needed to make an informed decision is incomplete, nudges can provide the relevant information. For instance, displaying the calorie content of menu items can help people make healthier food choices.

In economic models based on behavioral economics, implementing bounded rationality implies finding replacements for utility maximization and profit maximization as used in conventional general equilibrium models. Stock-flow consistent models (SFC) and agent-based models (ABM) often implement that agents follow a sequence of simple rule-of-thumb behavior instead of an optimization procedure. Other dynamic models interpret bounded rationality as "looking for the direction of improvement" such that agents use a gradient climbing approach to increase their utility.

== Principles of boundedness ==
In addition to bounded rationality, bounded willpower and bounded selfishness are two other key concepts in behavioral economics that challenge the traditional neoclassical economic assumption of perfectly rational, self-interested, and self-disciplined individuals.

Bounded willpower refers to the idea that people often have difficulty following through on their long-term plans and intentions due to limited self-control and the tendency to prioritize short-term desires. This can lead to problems like procrastination, impulsive spending, and unhealthy lifestyle choices. The concept of bounded willpower is closely related to the idea of hyperbolic discounting, which describes how people tend to value immediate rewards more highly than future ones, leading to inconsistent preferences over time.

While traditional economic models assume that people are primarily motivated by self-interest, bounded selfishness suggests that people also have social preferences and care about factors such as fairness, reciprocity, and the well-being of others. This concept helps explain phenomena like charitable giving, cooperation in social dilemmas, and the existence of social norms. However, people's concern for others is often bounded in the sense that it is limited in scope and can be influenced by factors such as in-group favoritism and emotional distance.

== In psychology ==
The collaborative works of Daniel Kahneman and Amos Tversky expand upon Herbert A. Simon's ideas in the attempt to create a map of bounded rationality. The research attempted to explore the choices made by what was assumed as rational agents compared to the choices made by individuals optimal beliefs and their satisficing behaviour. Kahneman cites that the research contributes mainly to the school of psychology due to imprecision of psychological research to fit the formal economic models; however, the theories are useful to economic theory as a way to expand simple and precise models and cover diverse psychological phenomena. Three major topics covered by the works of Daniel Kahneman and Amos Tversky include heuristics of judgement, risky choice, and framing effect, which were a culmination of research that fit under what was defined by Herbert A. Simon as the psychology of bounded rationality. In contrast to the work of Simon; Kahneman and Tversky aimed to focus on the effects bounded rationality had on simple tasks which therefore placed more emphasis on errors in cognitive mechanisms irrespective of the situation. The study undertaken by Kahneman found that emotions and the psychology of economic decisions play a larger role in the economics field than originally thought. The study focused on the emotions behind decision making such as fear and personal likes and dislikes and found these to be significant factors in economic decision making.

Bounded rationality is also shown to be useful in negotiation techniques as shown in research undertaken by Dehai et al. that negotiations done using bounded rationality techniques by labourers and companies when negotiating a higher wage for workers were able to find an equal solution for both parties.

== Influence on social network structure ==
Recent research has shown that bounded rationality of individuals may influence the topology of the social networks that evolve among them, in particular, Kasthurirathna and Piraveenan.

== See also ==
- Administrative Behavior
- Altruism
- Analysis paralysis
- Ars longa, vita brevis
- Carnegie School
- Cognitive bias
- Cognitive miser
- Ecological rationality
- Elitism
- Framing (social sciences)
- Homo economicus
- Memetics
- Neoclassical economics
- Organizing principle
- Parametric determinism
- Potential game § Bounded rational models
- Priority heuristic
- Prospect theory
- Psychohistory
- Rational ignorance
- Reinhard Selten
- Satisficing
- Social heuristics
- Subjective theory of value
- Substitution bias (psychology)
- Tragedy of the commons
- Transaction cost
- Utility maximization problem
