= Attribute substitution =

Type of cognitive bias

Attribute substitution is a psychological process thought to underlie a number of cognitive biases and perceptual illusions. It occurs when an individual has to make a judgment (of a target attribute) that is computationally complex, and instead substitutes a more easily calculated heuristic attribute. This substitution is thought of as taking place in the automatic intuitive judgment system, rather than the more self-aware reflective system. Hence, when someone tries to answer a difficult question, they may actually answer a related but different question, without realizing that a substitution has taken place. This explains why individuals can be unaware of their own biases, and why biases persist even when the subject is made aware of them. It also explains why human judgments often fail to show regression toward the mean.

The theory of attribute substitution unifies a number of separate explanations of reasoning errors in terms of cognitive heuristics. In turn, the theory is subsumed by an effort-reduction framework proposed by Anuj K. Shah and Daniel M. Oppenheimer, which states that people use a variety of techniques to reduce the effort of making decisions.

== History ==
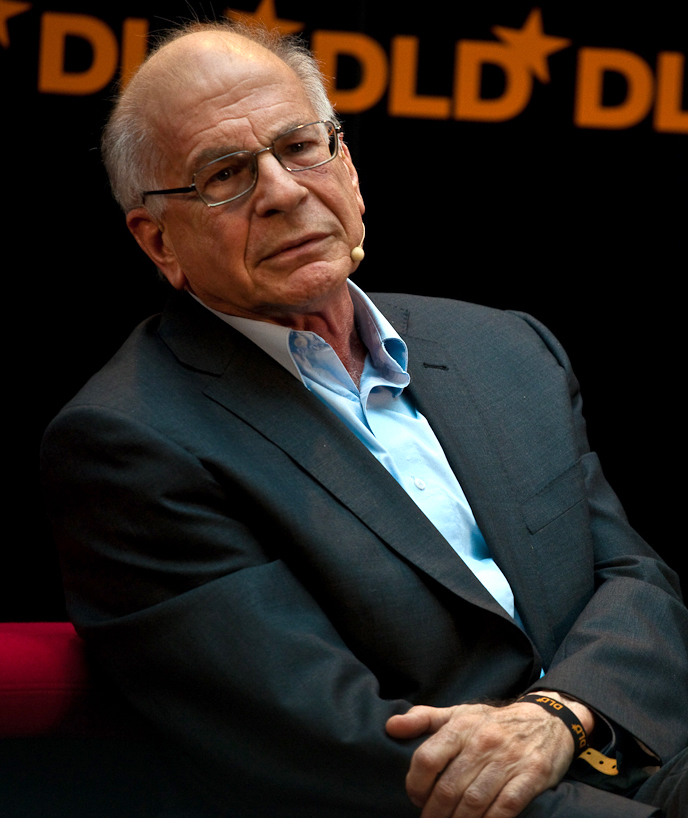
Daniel Kahneman

In a 1974 paper, psychologists Amos Tversky and Daniel Kahneman argued that a broad family of biases (systematic errors in judgment and decision) were explainable in terms of a few heuristics (information-processing shortcuts), including availability and representativeness.

In 1975, psychologist Stanley Smith Stevens proposed that the strength of a stimulus (e.g., the brightness of a light, the severity of a crime) is encoded neurally in a way that is independent of modality. Kahneman and Frederick built on this idea, arguing that the target attribute and heuristic attribute could be unrelated.

In a 2002 revision of the theory, Kahneman and Shane Frederick proposed attribute substitution as a process underlying these and other effects.

== Conditions ==
[P]eople are not accustomed to thinking hard, and are often content to trust a plausible judgment that comes to mind.

— Daniel Kahneman, American Economic Review 93 (5) December 2003, p. 1450

Kahneman and Frederick propose three conditions for attribute substitution:

1. The target attribute is relatively inaccessible. Substitution is not expected to take place in answering factual questions that can be retrieved directly from memory ("What is your birthday?") or about current experience ("Do you feel thirsty now?).
2. An associated attribute is highly accessible. This might be because it is evaluated automatically in normal perception or because it has been primed. For example, someone who has been thinking about their love life who is then asked about their happiness might substitute how happy they are with their love life rather than answer the question as asked.
3. The substitution is not detected and corrected by the reflective system. For example, when asked "A bat and a ball together cost $1.10. The bat costs $1 more than the ball. How much does the ball cost?" many subjects incorrectly answer $0.10. An explanation in terms of attribute substitution is that, rather than work out the sum, subjects parse the sum of $1.10 into a large amount and a small amount, which is easy to do. Whether they feel that is the right answer will depend on whether they check the calculation with their reflective system.

== Examples ==
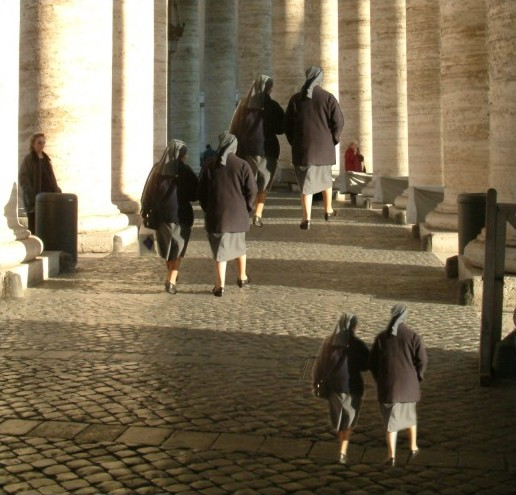
This illusion works because 3D (perspective) size is substituted for 2D size (all pairs are equal in size).

=== Optical illusions ===
Attribute substitution explains the persistence of some illusions. For example, when subjects judge the size of two figures in a perspective picture, their apparent sizes can be distorted by the 3D context, making a convincing optical illusion. The theory states that the three-dimensional size of the figure (which is accessible because it is automatically computed by the visual system) is substituted for its two-dimensional size on the page. Experienced painters and photographers are less susceptible to this illusion, because the two-dimensional size is more accessible to their perception.

=== Valuing insurance ===
Kahneman gives an example where some Americans were offered insurance against their own death in a terrorist attack while on a trip to Europe, while another group were offered insurance that would cover death of any kind on the trip. The former group were willing to pay more even though "death of any kind" includes "death in a terrorist attack", Kahneman suggests that the attribute of fear is being substituted for a calculation of the total risks of travel. Fear of terrorism for these subjects was stronger than a general fear of dying on a foreign trip.

=== Stereotypes ===
Stereotypes can be a source of heuristic attributes. In a face-to-face conversation with a stranger, judging their intelligence is more computationally complex than judging the colour of their skin. So if the subject has a stereotype about the relative intelligence of whites, blacks, and Asians, that racial attribute might substitute for the more intangible attribute of intelligence. The pre-conscious, intuitive nature of attribute substitution explains how subjects can be influenced by the stereotype while thinking that they have made an honest, unbiased evaluation of the other person's intelligence.

=== Morality and fairness ===
Sunstein argued that attribute substitution is pervasive when people reason about moral, political, or legal matters. Given a difficult, novel problem in these areas, people search for a more familiar, related problem (a "prototypical case") and apply its solution as the solution to the harder problem. According to Sunstein, the opinions of trusted political or religious authorities can serve as heuristic attributes when people are asked their own opinions on a matter. Another source of heuristic attributes is emotion: people's moral opinions on sensitive subjects like sexuality and human cloning may be driven by reactions such as disgust, rather than by reasoned principles. Critics demanded more evidence from Sunstein.

=== The beautiful-is-familiar effect ===
Monin reports a series of experiments in which subjects, looking at photographs of faces, have to judge whether they have seen those faces before. It is repeatedly found that attractive faces are more likely to be mistakenly labeled as familiar. Monin interprets this result in terms of attribute substitution. The heuristic attribute in this case is a "warm glow"; a positive feeling towards someone that might either be due to their being familiar or being attractive. This interpretation has been criticised, because not all the variance in the familiarity data is accounted for by attractiveness.

== Evidence ==
The most direct evidence, according to Kahneman, is a 1973 experiment that used a psychological profile of Tom W., a fictional graduate student. One group of subjects had to rate Tom's similarity to a typical student in each of nine academic areas (Law, Engineering, Library Science etc.). Another group had to rate how likely it is that Tom specialised in each area. If these ratings of likelihood are governed by probability, then they should resemble the base rates, i.e., the proportion of students in each of the nine areas (which had been separately estimated by a third group). A probabilistic judgment would say that Tom is more likely to be a Humanities student than Library Science, because many more students study Humanities, and the additional information in the profile is vague and unreliable. Instead, the ratings of likelihood matched the ratings of similarity almost perfectly, both in this study and a similar one where subjects judged the likelihood of a fictional woman taking different careers. This suggests that rather than estimating probability using base rates, subjects had substituted the more accessible attribute of similarity.

== See also ==
- Bounded rationality
- Inattentional blindness
- Labeling theory
- List of cognitive biases
- Neglect of probability
- Self-deception
