= Ecological rationality =

Ecological rationality is a particular account of practical rationality, which in turn specifies the norms of rational action – what one ought to do in order to act rationally. The presently dominant account of practical rationality in the social and behavioral sciences such as economics and psychology, rational choice theory, maintains that practical rationality consists in making decisions in accordance with some fixed rules, irrespective of context. Ecological rationality, in contrast, claims that the rationality of a decision depends on the circumstances in which it takes place, so as to achieve one's goals in this particular context. What is considered rational under the rational choice account thus might not always be considered rational under the ecological rationality account. Overall, rational choice theory puts a premium on internal logical consistency whereas ecological rationality targets external performance in the world. The term ecologically rational is only etymologically similar to the biological science of ecology.

== Rationality under rational choice theory ==
Ecological rationality challenges rational choice theory (RCT) as a normative account of rationality. According to rational choice theory, an action is considered rational if the action follows from preferences and expectations that satisfy a set of axioms, or principles. These principles are often justified based on consistency considerations – for example, intransitive preferences and expectations inconsistent with available information are ruled out. Rational choice theory, therefore, cashes out practical rationality as the optimal path of action given one's subjective representation of the world.

== Violations of rational choice theory ==
Since the second half of the 20th century, a body of research, by economists such as Maurice Allais and psychologists such as Amos Tversky and Daniel Kahneman, documented a collection of systematic violations of the principles of RCT. These violations are typically interpreted as demonstrations of irrationalities in human behavior. In contrast, the notion of Ecological Rationality questions the normative validity of RCT and therefore interprets the empirical findings in a fundamentally different way. As explicated below, violations of RCT might in fact denote rational action under some conditions.

== In research on fast and frugal heuristics ==
Gerd Gigerenzer argues that some observed behavior, although violating RCT principles, has been empirically shown to be rational in some environments. That is, one ought to violate the principles of RCT in order to act rationally in these environments. This idea, that the rationality of an action not only depends on internal criteria (e.g., transitivity) but also on the structure of the environment, was proposed earlier by Herbert A. Simon. Simon envisioned rationality as being shaped by a pair of scissors that cuts with two blades – one representing the structure of the task environment, the other the computational capacities of the agent. The theory of ecological rationality specifies precisely (and usually mathematically) the conditions on the environmental structure under which a rational actor should use one or another method in order to make more accurate/successful/transparent decisions, as these are measured by pre-determined, well-defined criteria.

=== Example: take-the-best heuristic ===
Consider the take-the-best heuristic, which can be used for finding the best from a set of two or more options according to some criterion. Rather than considering information about all attributes of each option, the heuristic uses only information on the most valid attribute (i.e., the attribute correlating the highest with the criterion) that discriminates between different options and chooses the option favored by this one attribute. Thus, it does not integrate all available information as required by RCT. Nonetheless, it was found that the take-the-best heuristic can yield more accurate choices than other models of decision-making including multiple linear regression which considers all available information. Such results have been replicated empirically in comparisons with sophisticated statistics and machine-learning models, such as CART decision trees, random forests, Naive Bayes, regularized regressions, support vector machines, and so on, and across a large number of decision problems (including choice, inference, and forecasting) and real-world datasets—for reviews see. As said above, to explain such success of take-the-best, one needs to figure out which environmental characteristics promote it and which do not. According to the theory of ecological rationality, examples of environmental characteristics that lead to the relatively higher accuracy of take-the-best compared to other models, include the (i) scarce or low quality of available information, (ii) high dispersion of validities of the attributes (also called the non-compensatoriness condition), and (iii) the presence of options dominating other options, including the conditions of simple and cumulative dominance. Some of these conditions also guarantee optimal performance for heuristics such as take-the-best. It has been found that such conditions are surprisingly prevalent in natural datasets, boosting the performance of take-the-best and other similar simple heuristics.

=== Example: 1/N heuristic ===
For a second example, consider the question of how to distribute an investment over several investment options. According to the 1/N heuristic, also called Naive Allocation, agents simply allocate shares of equal size to each investment option. In contrast to the prescriptions of RCT, this purportedly naive heuristic does not consider any of the available information, nor does it generate a preference ranking of the available options. When the choice environment is characterized by high predictive uncertainty, a large set of investment options, and limited information about past performance, no rational choice model (here in the sense of Bayesian versions of Markowitz's mean-variance optimization) was found to consistently outperform the 1/N heuristic on a variety of indicators.

=== Normative justifications ===
Given the results of the theory of ecological rationality, it seems that, if interested in external performance, one should not assume that RCT will lead to better or "more rational" decisions than simple heuristics such as take-the-best. Rather, one should find out the characteristics of the decision environment, and choose a method that the theory puts forward as better-performing for such environments.

There are also some additional justifications against an over-reliance on RCT.

First, RCT in some cases poses demands on cognitive abilities that humans do not have. Many real-world problems are computationally intractable – for example, making probabilistic inferences using Bayesian belief networks is NP-hard. Many theorists agree that accounts of rationality must not require "[...] capacities, abilities, and skills far beyond those possessed by human beings as they now are."

Second, even for problems that are tractable it has been argued that heuristics save effort, even if sometimes this is so at the cost of accuracy. Depending on the structure of the environment, this loss of accuracy might be small.

Third, there is a fundamental distinction between situations characterized by either risk (known risks) or uncertainty (unknown risks). In situations of risk, the accuracy-effort trade-off outlined above implies loss in accuracy as consequence of reducing the complexity of the decision strategy. In contrast, situations of uncertainty allow for less-is-more effects, describing situations in which systematically ignoring part of the available information leads to more accurate inferences. Adaptive heuristics, doing exactly this, may, therefore, be ecologically rational. An explanation of this finding is offered by the bias-variance dilemma, which is a mathematical formulation of how simplicity (which might looks as ignorance) tends to increase one source of estimation error (bias) but also to decrease another one (variance).

== In experimental economics ==
Independently of Gerd Gigerenzer, Vernon L. Smith has developed his own account of ecological rationality, mostly discussed in economics. The two notions are related, however Smith predicates the concept to social entities such as markets, which have evolved in a trial-and-error process to reaching an efficient outcome.

== See also ==
- Bounded rationality
- Heuristics in judgment and decision-making
- Less-is-more
- Take-the-best heuristic
- Fast-and-frugal trees
