= Deco (disambiguation) =

Deco (born 1977) is a Portuguese footballer.

Deco or DECO may also refer to:

- DECO Cassette System, a software loader by Data East
- DECO Online, a 2005 computer game
- Deco*27, a Japanese musician
- Deco Refreshments, Inc., a restaurant chain
- Deco Vs. Deco, a 2008 DVD by the Japanese rock band Maximum the Hormone
- Decò, an Italian supermarket and sponsor of the 2022 Serie B season
- The Deco, a restored 1930s cinema and theatre in Northampton, England
- Data East Corporation, a software company
- Decompression (diving), scuba diving slang
- Demos Commander, an orthodox file manager for Unix-like systems
- Gustavo Deco, Argentinian and Italian neuroscientist

== See also ==
- Art Deco (disambiguation)
