= Laura Martignon =

Colombian and Italian mathematician; lives in Germany

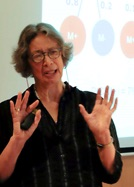
- Professor Laura Martignon
- Born: 1952; Bogotà, Colombia
- Education: University of Tübingen
- Awards: Gleichstellungs-Preis 2008, Ludwigsburg University
- Scientific career
- Fields: Mathematics, Mathematics Education, Mathematical Modeling, Gender and Mathematics Education, Decision Making
- Workplaces: Ludwigsburg University of Education

Laura Martignon (born 1952) is a Colombian and Italian professor and scientist. From 2003 until 2020 she served as a Professor of Mathematics and Mathematical Education at the Ludwigsburg University of Education. Until 2017 she was an Adjunct Scientist of the Max Planck Institute for Human Development in Berlin, where she previously worked as Senior Researcher. She also worked for ten years as a Mathematics Professor at the University of Brasília and spent a period of one and a half years, as visiting scholar, at the Hebrew University of Jerusalem.

== Education ==
Martignon obtained a bachelor's degree in Mathematics at Universidad Nacional de Colombia in Bogotà in 1971, a master's degree in Mathematics in 1975, and then graduated as a Doctor. rer. nat. in Mathematics at the University of Tübingen in 1978. She obtained her "emquadramento" (tenure) at the University of Brasília in 1984 and her German Habilitation in Neuroinformatics at the University of Ulm, Germany, in 1998.

== Academic contributions ==
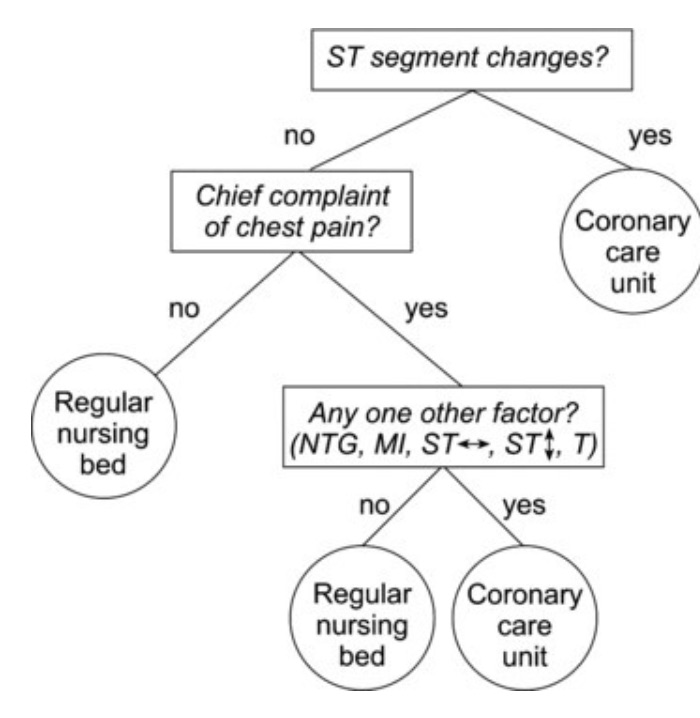
An example of Fast-and-Frugal Tree

Martignon specialized in Mathematics Education and, as an applied mathematician, in mathematical modeling collaborating in interdisciplinary scientific contexts. Together with physicist Thomas Seligman she applied functional analysis determining criteria for the applicability of integral transforms in n-body reaction calculations and constructing Hilbert Spaces for the embedding of observables and of density matrices. In Neuroinformatics she modeled synchronization in the spiking events of groups of neurons: With her colleagues from Neuroscience Günther Palm, Sonja Grün, Ad Aertsen, Hermann von Hasseln, Gustavo Deco and the statistician Kathryn Laskey she set the basis for valid measurements of higher order synchronizations.

Her recent contributions have been in probabilistic reasoning, decision making and their connections with Mathematics Education. In 1995 she was one of the founding members of the ABC Center for Adaptive Behavior and Cognition, directed by Gerd Gigerenzer first in Munich (1995–1997) at the Max Planck Institute for Psychological Research and then in Berlin at the Max Planck Institute for Human Development ( since 1997). With colleagues from ABC, mainly with Ulrich Hoffrage, she modeled the take-the-best heuristic as a non-compensatory linear model for comparison providing a first partial characterization of its ecological rationality ^{[MH]}. She is best known for having conceptualized and defined Fast-And-Frugal trees for classification and decision, mainly with Konstantinos Katsikopoulos and Jan Woike,^{[MKW]} ^{[WHM]} proving their fundamental properties, creating a theoretical bridge from natural frequencies to fast and frugal heuristics for classification and decision.

Today her work on reasoning motivates most of her research in Mathematics Education. With Stefan Krauss, Rolf Biehler, Joachim Engel, Christoph Wassner and Sebastian Kuntze she has propagated the tenets of the ABC Group on the advantages of natural information formats and decision heuristics in school and as a topic of Math Education^{[MK]}. She has collaborated with Keith Stenning, studying probability-free judgement based on defeasible logics and its impact for Mathematics Education ^{[SMV]}. She has also done research on Gender in Mathematics Education leading a project on the topic at her University and founding the review journal Mathematik und Gender. For a period of 6 years she was the representative of the Working Group Frauen und Mathematik of the German Society of Mathematics Education (GDM) .

== See also ==
- Max Planck Institute for Human development
- Mathematics and Gender at the Ludwigsburg University

== Selected publications ==
=== Books ===
- Wer Wagt, Gewinnt? (2019) Laura Martignon & Ulrich Hoffrage, Hogrefe: Bern
- Nachhaltigkeit und Gerechtigkeit: Grundlagen und schulische Konsequenzen (2008) de Haan, G., Kamp, G., Lerch, A., Martignon, L., Müller-Christ, G., Nutzinger, H.G., Springer: New York
- Simple Heuristics that Make us Smart (1999) Gigerenzer, Todd and the ABC Group, Oxford University Press
- Matrizes Positivas – Impa Press.

=== Articles ===
- | MH. | Martignon & Hoffrage 2002 Fast, frugal, and fit: Simple heuristics for paired comparison |
- | MKW. | Martignon, Katsikopoulos & Woike 2008 Categorization with Limited Resources: A Family of Simple Heuristics |
- | MK. | Martignon & Krauss 2009 Hands-On Activities for Fourth Graders: A Tool Box for Decision-Making and Reckoning with Risk |
- | SMV. | Stenning, Martignon & Varga, 2017 Probability-free judgment: Integrating Fast and Frugal Heuristic With a Logic of Interpretation |
- | WHM. | Woike, Hoffrage & Martignon, 2017 – Integrating and testing Natural Frequencies, naive Bayes and Fast-and-Frugal Trees. |

== Patents ==
- Patents by Inventor Laura Martignon
