= John McGrath (guitarist) =

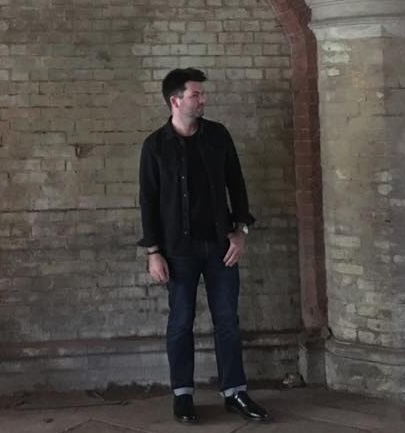
- Born: May 24, 1984 (age 42)
- Citizenship: Irish
- Education: University College Dublin (BA, BMus); Trinity College Dublin (MPhil); University of Liverpool (PhD, 2014)
- Occupations: guitarist; improvisor; academic
- Website: johnmcgrathmusic.com

John McGrath (born 24 May 1984) is an Irish guitarist, improvisor and academic based in London, UK. He is the author of Samuel Beckett, Repetition and Modern Music (Routledge 2018) and co-editor of 21st Century Guitar (Bloomsbury Academic 2023). His work spans experimental music, folk, improvisation, guitar innovations, and the intersection of music, literature and film. Having previously taught at University of Liverpool, LIPA, Goldsmiths and ICMP, McGrath is currently Associate Professor in Music at the University of Surrey and Deputy Director of the International Guitar Research Centre (IGRC), which he runs with Stephen Goss, Milton Mermikides and Honorary President John Williams.

== Background ==
Born and raised in Ireland, McGrath studied at University College Dublin (BA Hons - Music, English, Philosophy) and BMus Hons (Music) before Trinity College Dublin (MPhil). He earned his PhD at the University of Liverpool in 2014 (funded by the Arts & Humantities Research Council), focusing on the connections between Samuel Beckett’s works and modern music.

== Academic Output ==
McGrath's writing features in many publications, including Popular Music and Society, the Journal of Popular Music Studies, Haunted Soundtracks, The Bloomsbury Handbook of Popular Music Video Analysis, Cybermedia, Transmedia Directors, Time and Space in Words and Music and The Conversation. His first book, Samuel Beckett, Repetition, and Modern Music (Routledge 2018) was well received by critics. According to Edward Campbell, writing in Music & Letters, the book "benefits from having been written by someone who is as at home with music studies as he is with literature." Drew Daniel, wrote for The Wire that "McGrath’s book is salutary in flagging the deliberately jarring tactics of the avant garde, and getting the reader to grasp what remains permanently uncanny about our pleasure in Beckett and Feldman’s exploration of both the playful humour and subtle queasiness to be found within their repetitive forms". In Irish Studies Review, Michael Palmese described the monograph as "a valuable addition for the critical insights it provides through meticulous analyses. In an interview for Burning Ambulance, David Menestres called the text "a wonderful new book", discussing how it "dives deep into the musicality of Beckett’s work and how it has shaped certain aspects of modern music, focusing mainly on the works of Feldman and the guitarist Scott Fields". In a review for Psychology of Music, Monica Esslin-Peard described the book as raising "interesting questions about the relationship between words and music, aesthetics and musical analysis".

John co-edited 21st Century Guitar: Evolutions and Augmentations with Richard Perks (Bloomsbury Academic 2023). Joe Satriani wrote the following about the book: "The thing about the guitar is that it has to be constantly re-imagined, de-constructed, then re-constructed if it is to continue to be a vital force in music’s future landscapes. 21st Century Guitar is the new grimoire in this quest for the instrument’s ongoing reinventions".

He has presented papers internationally at the Hong Kong Academy of the Performing Arts, as part of the 3rd Altamira Guitar Symposium; the International Guitar Research Centre; Royal Musical Association; MSMI at RNCM; Music and the Moving Image at NYU, New York; Kookmin University, Seoul; Society for Musicology in Ireland; Word and Music Association, Graz; SCMS, Denver; IASPM and many others. He sits on the editorial board for Sonic Scope (MIT Press) and is an external examiner for BIMM and AMS. He has acted as invited peer reviewer for Routledge, Brill, Bloomsbury, Orpheus, Popular Music & Society, Music, Sound & the Moving Image, and Music & Letters.

== Music ==
As a professional guitarist and composer, McGrath bridges traditional techniques with innovative approaches, exploring live technology, improvisation, and collaboration. His compositions have been featured in The Wire, RTE Radio 1, BBC Radio, and several television programs. His music has been showcased at prominent venues such as Tate Modern, Kings Place, Cafe Oto and FACT. Having cut his teeth touring as a teenager with Irish showbands, McGrath has collaborated with many ensembles and artists in his career including: Dustin Wong, Darren Hayman (Hefner), Mark Roberts (PiL), Cavalier Song, Simon Stafford (Longpigs / Mescaleros), History of Harry, Kate Smith and Rob Strachan (Bonnocons of Doom / Black Snow Rodeo), Rhys Chatham, Howard Skempton, Benedict Taylor, Bill Thompson, and the aPAtT Orchestra. Recent session work includes two records with The Unattached (Gare du Nord). John has performed on The Late Late Show and had a live recorded vinyl remixed by Philip Jeck as part of the Liverpool Biennial. Additionally, he has received commissions to compose for the IMMIX ensemble and has performed new music alongside extensive arrangements of his works with the group. As a solo artist, McGrath has graced various festivals and shared the stage with performers like Richard Dawson, Gwenifer Raymond, Laraaji, and Sun Araw.

Bill Meyer writing for Dusted Magazine said that "McGrath is like a jeweler, crafting small but perfectly formed pieces that tempt you to pick them up and hold them to the light, just to get a better glance", while The Wire said "his versatile, experimental approach, reminiscent of Jim O’Rourke, Christian Fennesz, and Marc Ribot, pushes at the boundaries of new guitar music and the UK avant folk scene." For Aquarium Drunkard, Tyler Wilcox described McGrath as "bringing a touch of the 21st Century to the guitar soli scene".

== Books ==
- McGrath, John (2018). Samuel Beckett, Repetition and Modern Music. Routledge. ISBN 978-1-4724-7537-4.
- Perks, Richard; McGrath, John, eds. (2023). 21st Century Guitar: Evolutions and Augmentations. New York: Bloomsbury Academic. ISBN 978-1-5013-7329-9.

== Selected Music ==
- Theodora Laird / John McGrath / Douglas Benford (Otoroku 194 2025)
- Wake & Whisper (CSR 2019)
- Lanterns EP (CSR 2014)
