= Morten Kringelbach =

Danish neuroscientist (born 1970)

Morten L. Kringelbach
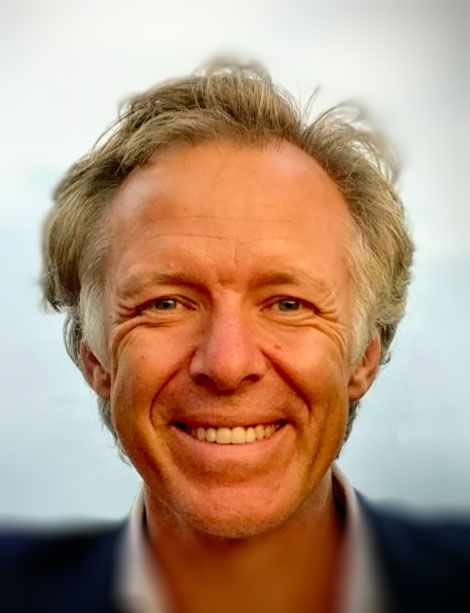
- Born: Copenhagen, Denmark
- Awards: Science Communication Prize 2006, Danish Ministry of Higher Education and Science
- Scientific career
- Fields: Neuroscience, Cognitive Science
- Workplaces: University of Oxford, University of Aarhus
- Website: hedonia.kringelbach.org

Morten L. Kringelbach is a professor of neuroscience at University of Oxford, UK and Aarhus University, Denmark. He is the director of the Centre for Eudaimonia and Human Flourishing, fellow of Linacre College, Oxford and board member of the Empathy Museum.

== Research overview ==
Kringelbach has made contributions to a range of topics within neuroscience using neuroimaging, deep brain stimulation and whole-brain modelling. His research is focused on reverse-engineering the human brain and in particular he has identified some of the evolutionary principles and heuristics of teleological computation enabling us to survive and thrive, which depend on intact human brain systems related to emotion, pleasure and eudaimonia. Together with Kent Berridge he has identified brain mechanisms underlying the reward system and identified a network of hedonic hotspots essential for the fundamental pleasure cycle of 'wanting', 'liking' and learning. In a large series of neuroimaging studies of many rewards, he has elucidated the spatiotemporal organisation of the orbitofrontal cortex, for example, demonstrating a fast parental signature of infant cuteness even in adults who are not yet parents. Kringelbach and Berridge have also investigated the close links between pleasure and happiness.

Kringelbach has also worked with neurosurgeon Tipu Aziz to elucidate the neural mechanisms of deep brain stimulation for Parkinson's disease, essential tremor, dystonia and chronic pain

Together with Peter Vuust, he founded the 'Center for Music in the Brain' at University of Aarhus focused on better understanding the neuroscience of music and in particular the dual questions of how music is processed in the brain and how this can inform our understanding of fundamental principles behind brain functioning in general.

Furthermore, Kringelbach and Gustavo Deco have developed a research programme of whole-brain modelling for combining structural connectivity data Diffusion Tensor Imaging with functional neuroimaging data such as fMRI and magnetoencephalography. This allows for the discovery of causal mechanisms of brain function, and they have e.g. identified fundamental mechanisms and principles of integration and segregation, as well as metastability and coherence. In time, these findings might help open up for a better understanding and potential treatment of neuropsychiatric disorders, as well as the role of one of the cardinal symptoms, namely anhedonia, the lack of pleasure.

== See also ==
- Connectome
- Happiness
- Resting state fMRI
- Motivation
- Pleasure
- Reward system
- Biologically inspired computing

== Bibliography ==
Books

- Kringelbach M.L. & Phillips, H. (2014) Emotion: pleasure and pain in the brain. Oxford: Oxford University Press.
- Preston S., Kringelbach M.L. & Knutson, B., eds. (2014) The Interdisciplinary Science of Consumption. Cambridge, Mass.: MIT Press.
- Hansen P.C., Kringelbach M.L & Salmelin R, eds. (2010) MEG: an introduction to methods. New York: Oxford University Press.
- Cornelissen P.L., Hansen P.C., Kringelbach M.L & Pugh K, eds. (2010) The neural basis of reading. New York: Oxford University Press.
- Kringelbach M.L. & Berridge, K.C., eds. (2010) Pleasures of the Brain. New York: Oxford University Press.
- Kringelbach M.L (2009) The Pleasure Center. Trust your animal instincts. New York: Oxford University Press (Polish translation (2015)).
- Kringelbach M.L (2009) Njótingarsami Heilin (translation P.Nielsen). Thorshavn: Ítriv.
- Kringelbach M.L (2008) Den nydelsesfulde hjerne. Nydelsens og begærets mange ansigter. Copenhagen: Gyldendal.
- Kringelbach M.L. (2004) Hjernerum. Den følelsesfulde hjerne. Copenhagen: People'sPress.

Articles

List of All Publications
