= Milton Mermikides =

British musician and academic

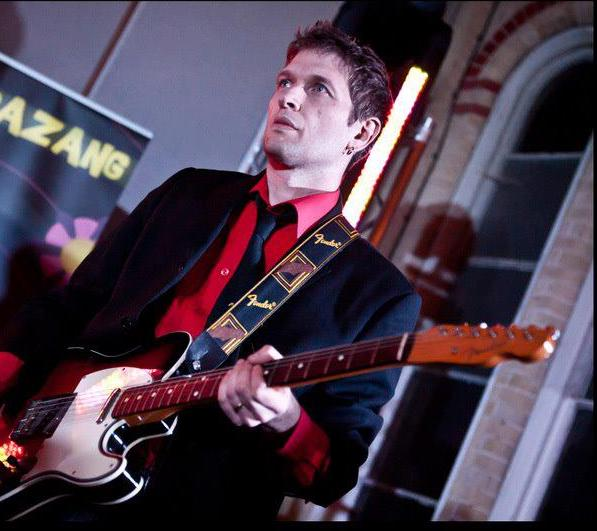
Dr Milton Mermikides with Voodoo Trombone Quartet

Milton Mermikides (born 26 May 1971) is a British composer, guitarist and academic of Greek heritage. His diverse output includes compositions, academic papers, talks (TED (conference)) and musical performances. He has worked with a number of artists including Tim Minchin, Pat Martino, John Williams, Tod Machover, Steve Winwood and Brian Eno and research bodies such as the Wellcome Trust, UCL Neuroscience, British Library, Science Museum, Aldeburgh Music and the Smithsonian Institution. Mermikides is widely recognised as a leading figure in data sonification and, in 2025, published his book Hidden Music: The Composer’s Guide to Sonification with the Cambridge University Press. His 2004 work Bloodlines, written with his sister Dr Alex Mermikides, received critical acclaim. Bloodlines was created by translating his daily blood results, whilst suffering from Acute Lymphoblastic Leukaemia, into each second of a musical composition.

He is the 37th Gresham Professor of Music and currently holds the position of Professor of Music at the University of Surrey and Senior Research Fellow and Composer in Residence for the Centre of Eudaimonia and Human Flourishing (Linacre College, Oxford University). He is also a professor of Jazz Guitar at the Royal College of Music in London and previously held the post of Head of Music Technology and Lecturer in Music at the Royal Academy of Music. In 2014 Mermikides co-founded the International Guitar Research Centre (IGRC) with Stephen Goss and John Williams.

== Background ==
Milton John Mermikides was born in Hampton, England in 1971 to CERN nuclear physicist Michael Mermikides and law student Olga Lioufis. He travelled widely as a child, receiving music classes from Ivor Cutler at Fox Primary School in Kensington, London and eventually attending Highgate School in North London. He gained a BSc in Analytical and Descriptive Economics from the London School of Economics and a BMus in Jazz Performance and Composition from Berklee College of Music (Boston, USA). Whilst at Berklee he studied Jazz Improvisation with Ed Tomassi, Hal Crook and John Damian.

Mermikides is an atheist and sceptic and a vocal opponent to the Anti-vax movement. He has been associated with the sceptic movement and has collaborated with George Hrab (with several appearances and references on his podcast and an interview of George by Milton on his album Trebuchet – the 'Virtual liner notes' ), the QED conference (for which he wrote the theme tune), the James Randi Educational Foundation and The Amazing Meeting. He was also interviewed on Meet the Skeptics.

== Compositions ==
His music blends data sonification, Jazz, modernist, generative, world music, IDM, groove, rock and electroacoustic genres. These are informed by research into musical theory, cognition & perception, scientific concepts, natural processes, algorithmic composition, microrhythm and improvisation. He has referred to this radical blending of styles, concepts and processes as “liminalism”, a "challenging, blending and melding of the boundaries of musical style, and of the limits of music perception, processes and accessibility". His data sonification work Bloodlines was broadcast on BBC Radio 4 Midweek, and featured in the Times Higher Education Supplement. A later data sonification work, Careful, was featured in The Guardian. He has written music for plays (Derry Playhouse), Film Scores (Martino: Unstrung), arrangements for string quartet (D Rail, played live on BBC Radio 4's Intune), sound installations (Microcosmos at the Royal Academy of Music). In 2018, Milton Mermikides was interviewed by Evelyn Glennie on BBC Radio 4 on data sonification and his translations of Bridget Riley prints into music.

== Collaborations ==
Mermikides has collaborated extensively with a diverse range of artists, academics and scientists. Collaborations include; writing the score for Pat Martino's film Martino:Unstrung (2008), arranging and production credits (with Bridget Mermikides) on Tim Minchin's Storm animation, and arranging music for Brian Eno for Hiroko Koshino's fashion shows in China and Japan. Mermikides was previously guitarist and arranger for band Stax (previously called Souled Out) with singer Sam Brown whose guest artists included Steve Winwood and Tim Rice.

He has also worked with Sleep experts and his Sound Asleep project was exhibited in the Design Museum, London, and featured on BBC Radio 4 Inside Science. Most recently he has been working with Professor Morten Kringelbach of Oxford University drawing parallels between circadian rhythms and musical theory, culminating in a presentation of new music at a public lecture hosted by the British Neuroscience Association.

In 2006 Mermikides founded the Eclectic Guitar Orchestra (Milton's Big EGO) – a guitar orchestra made up entirely of eminent guitarists. Members have included Craig Ogden, John Williams, Paco Peña, Jake Willson, Thomas Leeb, Declan Zapala, Stephen Goss, Gary Ryan, George Hrab and Bridget Mermikides.

In 2020, a long term collaboration with music technology pioneer Peter Zinovieff climaxed in the presentation of a paper at the EVA London 2020 conference . The paper ‘Revisiting December Hollow: Unearthing emotive shape’ was a description of the project – a developed realisation of Zinovieff’s 1969 December Hollow ‘fold-out score’ concept. The compositional system is designed to generate electronic music and/or conventional scores by slicing through a three-dimensional topographical score of ‘emotional zones’. Each zone is associated with a vector of musical parameters and by selecting various trajectories through the shape, countless pieces may be generated.

Recent collaborations include those with Tim Flach, Professor Robin May, Professor Morten Kringelbach, Professor Sarah Hart and Professor Chris Lintott.

== Academic output ==
Mermikides gained a PhD from the University of Surrey in 2010 for his thesis 'Changes Over Time'. His academic output consists of many published articles including 'Rondo All Turca', for Total Guitar Magazine, 'On Composing: How To Be A Successful Computer-based Composer' (2010) for Computer Music Magazine Special: Making It, 'Parallel Worlds', '5 Decades of the Jam Band' 'Extreme Guitar Concepts' and 'Bossa Appreciation' (2014) for Guitar Techniques Magazine.

In 2025, Mermikides’ book ‘Hidden Music: The Composers’ Guide to Sonification’ was published by Cambridge University Press. He has also contributed chapters to many books including Music and Shape published by Oxford University Press and frequently shares articles on music theory on his website.

He has given many keynote presentations, including a talk for TEDx Groningen in April 2016 entitled 'Everything we do is music', at the Hong Kong Academy of the Performing Arts in 2018 as part of the 3rd Altamira Guitar Symposium and the International Guitar Research Centre, The British Sleep Society, Royal Physiological Society, Studium generale and the Frank Mohr Institute. In 2019 he shared a keynote presentation with Jim Al-Khaleli at the University of Surrey Doctoral Conference.

As the 37th Gresham College Professor of Music, Mermikides has presented three series of lectures: ‘The Nature of Music’ (2023), ‘Worlds of Music’ (2024) and ‘The Gresham Festival of Musical Ideas’ (2025).

In 2015 he was hailed a 'Rap Genius' by Gareth Malone OBE for his satirical instruction article on writing a generic Eurovision song. He has also written an article on the controversial 432 Hz Movement and has been interviewed as an expert in ancient Greek Tuning on BBC Radio 3 Music Matters. He was supervisor for Bill Bruford's PhD at the University of Surrey.

Milton's work features in many publications including The Oxford Handbook of Computer Music, Nature Immunology, New dramaturgy: international perspectives on theory and practice, Medical Humanities Journal, Consciousness, Theatre, Literature and the Arts and The Anatomy of the Science Play.

== Leukaemia and fundraising ==
In 2004 Milton Mermikides was diagnosed with Acute Lymphoblastic Leukaemia. On 8 April 2005, he received a life saving bone-marrow transplant from his sister Dr Alex Mermikides. Whilst undergoing intensive radiotherapy and chemotherapy treatment, he set up a website – miltcentral.com (now archived on his website miltonline.com) – and produced regular blog posts and videos from Charing Cross and Hammersmith Hospitals documenting his treatment for leukaemia and bone marrow transplant. His courage and productivity during this period was inspirational to many fellow cancer sufferers and received global attention from leukaemia patients, carers, scientists, schools, skeptical groups and musicians. This later led to a scholarship from the James Randi Educational Foundation, and appearing as a judge in the final of the 2006 Air Guitar World Championships in Oulu, Finland. Through various fundraising efforts he has since raised over £20,000 for Cancerbackup, Anthony Nolan and the Macmillan Cancer Trust. In 2015, to celebrate the 10th anniversary of his bone marrow transplant, Mermikides put on a charity concert in Bush Hall, London, called Milton's Big Ego.

== List of works ==
=== Electronic works ===
- AMRt (2018)
- Deny II (2018)
- Heart of Mouse (2018)
- Late Morning (2018)
- Movement in Squares (2018)
- The Platelets (2018)
- To a Summers Days (2018)
- Take Your Seats (2016)
- ACTG (2015)
- Distant Harmony I-III (2015)
- Starstuff (2015)
- Circles (2015)
- Sound Asleep (2014)
- Microcosmos (2006)
- Bloodlines (2004) – Live electronics
- Primal Sound (2004)

=== Electronics with acoustic instruments ===
==== Classical guitar with live electronics ====
- Bumbershoot (2019)
- Insighted (2019)
- Corale (2017)
- 2 Blue Circles (2014)
- Asini (2014)
- Frees (2014)
- I(c)escape (2014)
- Limnos (2014)
- Spirals (2014)
- The Broken Music Box (2014)

==== Chamber music with electronics ====
- Mindfield (2019) Piano and Electronics
- fall.rise (2019) Chamber Ensemble and Electronics
- Music from Albino Parts (With Brian Doherty – 2019) Violin, Piano and Electronics
- Music from Invisible Man (2018) 'Cello, Percussion and Electronics
- Nataraja (2018) Violin and Electronics
- Music from The Monk, The Bird & The Priest (With Brian Doherty- 2017) Violin, Piano and Electronics
- Music from Time Riders (2017) Violin, Piano, Electric Guitars and Electronics
- Solar (2017) Violin, Viola, Cello and Electronics
- Suite from Careful (2016) String, Percussion, Harp and Electronics/Live Electronics
- Geometudes Nos.1–5 (2015) Piano, Synth and Violin
- The Escher Café (2011) 2 Violins, 'Cello, Bass Clarinet, Hang and Electronics
- QED (conference) Theme (2010) Violin, Trumpet, Harpsichord, Piano, Synth, Drums and Electronics
- Terminal (with Peter Gregson (cellist) 2008) 'Cello and Electronics
- Omnia 5'33" (2007) 'Cello and Live Electronics
- Event Horizon (2007) 'Cello and Electronics
- Koshino Sound (Hiroko Koshino 2007 Autumn Collection) Violin and Electronics
- The Selfish Theme (2007) Guitar, Bass, Drums & Live Electronics
- Kalmer (2007) Guitar, Bass, Drums & Live Electronics
- Atona Sonata (2006) 'Cello and Loop Pedal
- Factory (2006) 'Cello and Electronics

=== Acoustic solo and chamber ===
- Hivemind (2019) (Guitar Orchestra)
- Insighted for Ukulele (2019) Solo Ukulele
- Changes (2016) Violin, Viola and 'Cello
- 3 Lights (2016) Violin, Viola and 'Cello
- Another Day (2015) Orchestra
- Birth and Death (2015) Solo Piano
- Crystals (2015) Solo Piano
- Dark Shards (2015) Solo Piano
- Irrational Music (2015) Piano, Strings and Percussion
- Outbreak (2015) String Orchestra
- Seed Pods (2015) String Orchestra
- Wave (2015) String Orchestra
- Filter (2007) Guitar and Bass
- Standard Deviation (2007) Jazz Guitar Duo
- Rowing Towards the Sunlight (2006) Classical Guitar Ensemble
- Creation (2002) Solo Flute
- Anomaly for Solo Violin (2001) Solo Violin
- The Cryptic Tryptych (2001) Solo 'Cello
- D-Rail (2000) String Quartet
- Little Orchestra (1997) Solo Classical Guitar
- One Last Surviving (1996) Violin, 'Cello and Clarinet
- il Gioco è Finito (1995) Soprano, Violin, Bass Guitar, Electric Guitar, Drums, Keyboards

=== Film scores and installations ===
- Sound Asleep Video Installation (2015)
- Music from Wake Up and Smell the Coffee (2012)
- Music from Martino:Unstrung (2008)
- Flatlanders (2004)

=== Theme tunes ===
- Lady Geek (2012)
- QED (2011)
- 365 days of Astronomy (2011)
- Superwoo Duo (Rhys Morgan) (2011)
- The Amaz!ng Meeting (2010)
- The Pod Delusion (2009)

=== Albums ===
- Hidden Music (2015)
- Sound Asleep (2014)
- The Theme Attic (2014)

== Notable students ==
Adam Betts of Three Trapped Tigers
Julian Bliss
Bill Bruford
Gareth Coker
Kit Downes
Thomas Gould
Jasper Høiby
Ivo Neame
Gwilym Simcock
Alexander Sitkovetsky
Tusks (musician)
