= Ludwigsburg University of Education =

Coordinates: 48.9098°N 9.1831°E

Pädagogische Hochschule Ludwigsburg (Ludwigsburg University of Education)
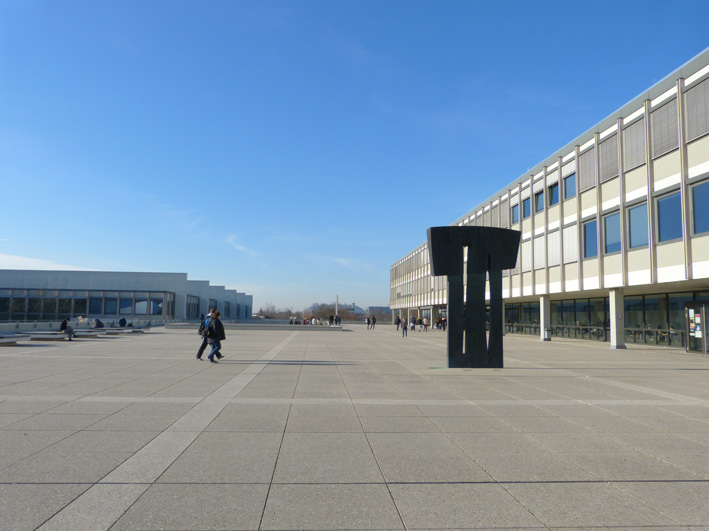
- Established: 1962
- Students: c. 6,100
- Location: Ludwigsburg, Baden-Württemberg, Germany
- Website: www.ph-ludwigsburg.de

The Ludwigsburg University of Education (German Pädagogische Hochschule Ludwigsburg), also called in English the University of Ludwigsburg and the Pedagogical University of Ludwigsburg, is an institution of higher education in Ludwigsburg, Germany. Pädagogische Hochschule is usually translated as "University of Education".

The university trains educators for primary schools, general secondary schools (Hauptschule), middle-ranking secondary schools (Realschule), and special schools. It also has an M.Sc. course in Professional Education and has academic programs, research projects, and a PhD program, operated jointly with universities in Stuttgart and Tübingen. Currently the University of Education has about 5500 students and 430 members of staff.

The present-day institution grew out of the Stuttgart Pedagogical Institute, founded in 1946, which became a Pädagogische Hochschule in 1962 and was moved to Ludwigsburg in 1966. The Ludwigsburg University of Education is now one of six Pädagogische Hochschulen in the state of Baden-Württemberg.

== Notable academics ==
- Arthur Engel (born 1928), mathematician
- Joachim Engel (born 1954), professor of mathematics
- Alexander Filipović (born 1975), professor of ethics
- Thomas Knaus (born 1974), professor of education
- Laura Martignon (born 1952), professor of mathematics

== Notable alumni ==
- Rainer Arnold (born 1950), SPD politician
- Isabel Cueto (born 1968), tennis player
