= Alexander Filipović =

German ethicist (born 1975)

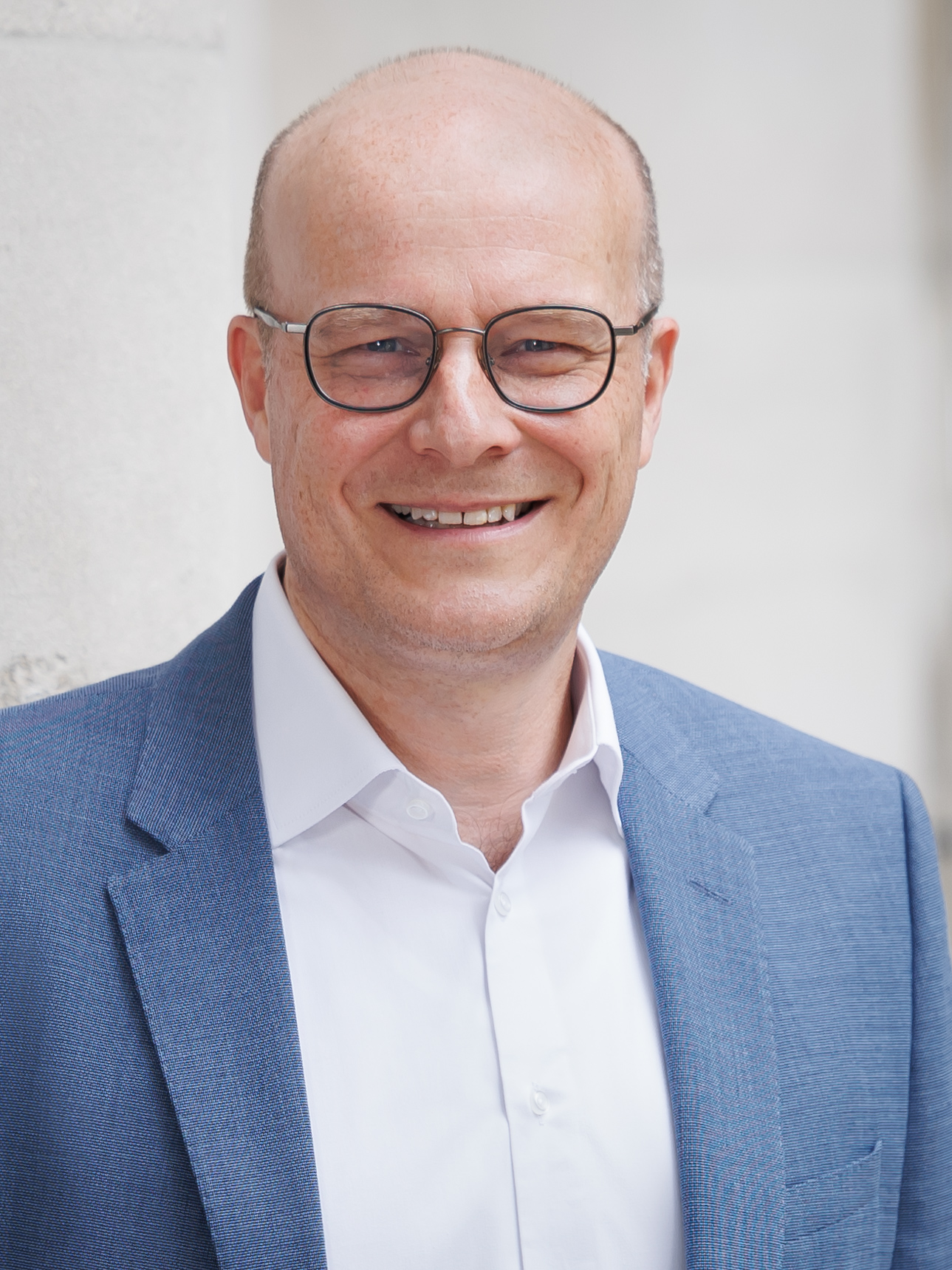
- Born: January 8, 1975 (age 51); Germany
- Education: University of Bamberg
- Occupations: Ethicist, media ethicist, theologian
- Employer: University of Vienna
- Known for: Media ethics Digital ethics Post-editorial society
- Awards: Bavarian Culture Prize (2006)

Alexander Filipović (born 8 January 1975) is a German ethicist, media ethicist and theologian. He has been Professor of Social Ethics at the Faculty of Catholic Theology at the University of Vienna since February 2021. Filipović serves as co-editor of the media science journal Communicatio Socialis and coordinates the German media ethics network Netzwerk Medienethik.

== Profile ==
Alexander Filipović studied Catholic Theology, Communication Science, and German Studies at University of Bamberg, completing his studies in 2000 with a magister artium thesis on ethics and public relations. A recipient of the prestigious doctoral scholarship of the German Academic Scholarship Foundation and later assistant researcher at the Catholic Theological Faculty of University of Bamberg, he received his PhD in Social Ethics. His doctoral dissertation on "Christian Social Ethics and the Public Communication of the Knowledge Society" was awarded the Bavarian Culture Prize in 2006.

After teaching engagements at Ilmenau University of Technology and Ludwigsburg University of Education, Filipović worked at the Institute for Christian Social Sciences at University of Münster. In 2012, he completed his habilitation thesis on applied ethics and philosophical pragmatism, which a review in the academic journal Ethik und Gesellschaft calls "the cornerstone for a continuing work with the potentials of pragmatism in the discipline of social ethics" and an "impulse to overcome the existing fears of interaction" with philosophical pragmatism in Christian social ethics. Since 2011, Filipović serves as an advisor to the publicist commission of the Catholic Episcopal Conference of Germany.

In 2013, Filipović was appointed as professor for media ethics at the Munich School of Philosophy. The university's president Johannes Wallacher called him the "ideal candidate" and referred to his "interdisciplinary work on issues in communication science and media ethics.". In 2016, the Munich School of Philosophy, the Catholic University of Eichstätt-Ingolstadt, and the Catholic University of Applied Sciences in Munich announced a strategic partnership to establish the Center for Media Ethics and Digital Society with Alexander Filipović and Klaus-Dieter Altmeppen as its founding directors.

In 2021, he became Professor of Social Ethics at the Faculty of Catholic Theology at the University of Vienna. His main areas of work and research are listed as follows: Fundamental questions of Christian social ethics, ethics of public communication (media ethics) and technology ethics / digital ethics.

In 2025 he was a visiting scholar at the Markkula Center for Applied Ethics at Santa Clara University, California.

== Media Ethics ==
=== The Post-Editorial Society ===
In reference to Berhard Pörksen's utopian idea of the "editorial society" (redaktionelle Gesellschaft), Alexander Filipović has proposed the term "post-editorial society" to describe the era of real time publication of factual claims on social media without the necessary verification processes in place that mark one of the core tenets of journalism's professional ethics: fact-checking. While only journalists needed professional verification and interpretation skills in the past, nowadays these professional skills should not be limited to the journalistic profession, but are required for all who aim to responsibly source and evaluate their information about current events. In an interview with the German newspaper taz, Filipović used the 2016 Nice truck attack and the 2016 Munich shooting as examples: "We have no editorial boards for our public communication. We saw where this leads in the cases of the terror attack in Nice and now in Munich. People turn on their cameras and spread images, videos and false information extremely fast."

=== Ethics of Image Publication ===
Filipović has commented on the ethics of online image publication in the wake of the Death of Alan Kurdi, claiming that "there are different rules for images and texts" since images "burn themselves into the retina" and "stick in our memory much quicker". He warned that "many books might be much more impressive and might say more about the different dimensions of a situation, but an iconic image with a child stays with us for many more years." About another key image of the civil war in Syria, Mahmoud Raslans photo of the Syrian boy Omran Daqneesh who was injured by air strikes in Aleppo in August 2016, Alexander Filipović has said in Der Tagesspiegel that it increased public pressure and could give policy makers a push: "It can accomplish a lot, because it gives suffering a face."

=== Political Correctness and Satire ===
After the French satire magazine Charlie Hebdo published a controversial caricature of the dead refugee child Alan Kurdi with the tagline "so close to the finish," Alexander Filipović connected the issues of political correctness and satire in an interview with Süddeutsche Zeitung: "There is a society-wide regulation of what counts as politically correct, of what may and may not be said in society. ... Many people equate moral reasoning in general with this political correctness. But it is something entirely different. Satire plays with these boundaries." Filipović emphasizes the constructive public role of satire and the responsibility of content consumers: "In all our discussion on the issue of satire we realize that we have trouble to argue about values and morals in public. If people would take the proper time to study the caricature in detail, if they would refrain from posting something for two days, and if they would reflect on what it might be illustrating, much would be gained."
