= Stephen Goss =

Welsh composer and guitarist (born 1964)

Stephen Goss (born 2 February 1964) is a Welsh composer, guitarist and academic. His compositional output includes orchestral and choral works, chamber music, and solo pieces. His music draws freely on a number of styles and genres. He is particularly known for his guitar music, which is widely performed and recorded.

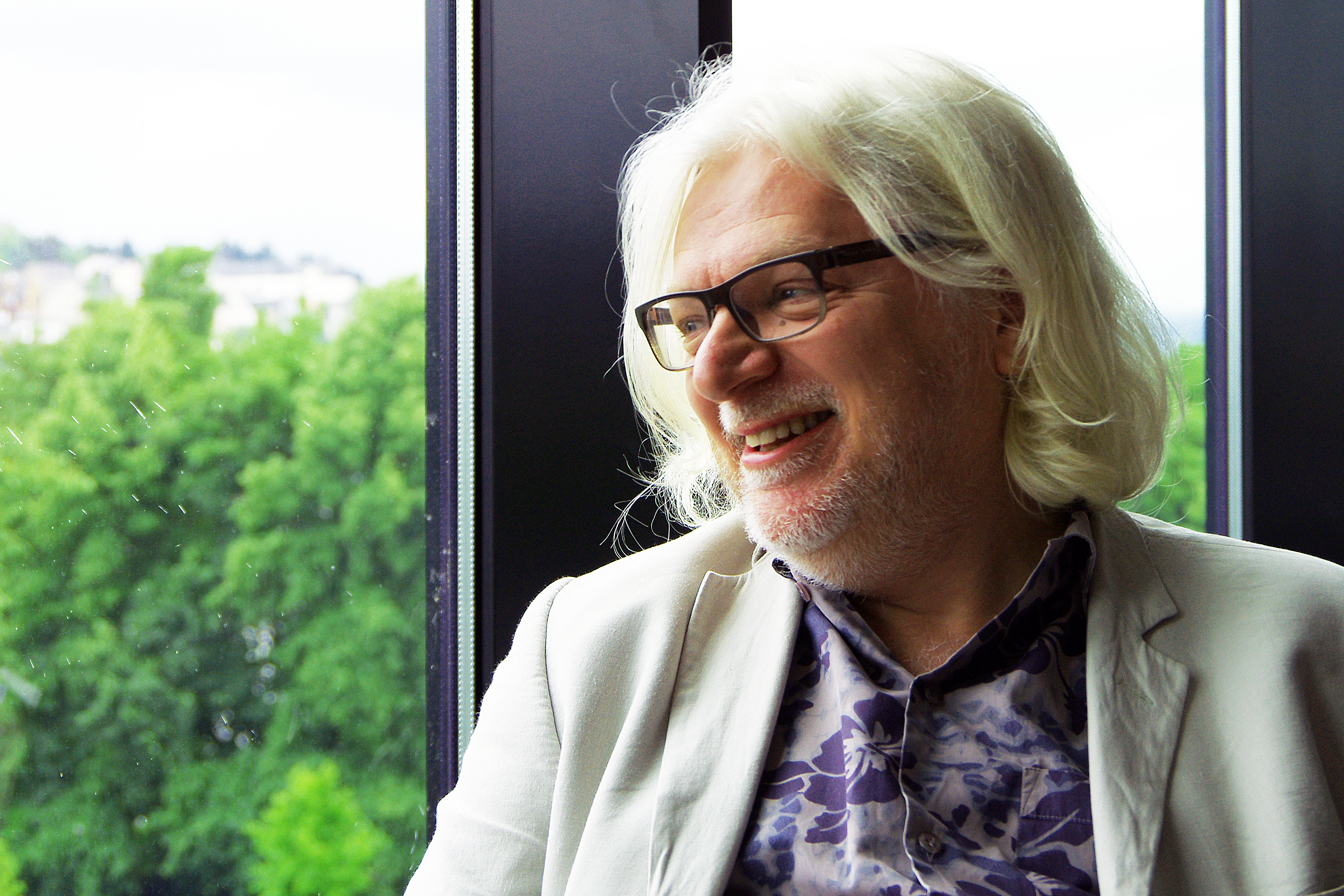
Stephen Goss, Welsh composer and guitarist

As of 2026, he is Professor of Composition in the School of Arts, Humanities, and Creative Industries at the University of Surrey. He is also a professor of guitar at the Royal Academy of Music in London and the director of the International Guitar Research Centre, which he founded with John Williams and Milton Mermikides in 2014. Before moving to the University of Surrey in 1999, he taught at the Yehudi Menuhin School.

Goss studied at the Royal Academy of Music (where he won the Julian Bream Prize in 1986) and the Universities of Bristol and London (where he completed his doctorate in 1997). His composition teachers were Edward Gregson, Robert Saxton, Peter Dickinson and Anthony Payne, and he studied guitar with Michael Lewin. He has been nominated for an Ivor Novello Award, and is a Fellow of the Royal Academy of Music.

== Compositions ==
Goss's work has included several projects with the guitarist John Williams, who recorded and toured his Guitar Concerto (2012) with the Royal Philharmonic Orchestra in 2014. Goss has collaborated with artists as diverse as Andrew Lloyd Webber, Alt-J, and Avi Avital. In his role as composer-in-residence for the Orpheus Sinfonia, he wrote the Concerto for Five (2013) for the combination of violin, saxophone, cello, bass, piano and orchestra, and the Piano Concerto (Signum Classics 2013) - the first classical concert piece to feature an interactive tablet app.

Orchestras which have performed his music include The Russian National Orchestra (under Mikhail Pletnev), The China National Symphony Orchestra, The Royal Liverpool Philharmonic Orchestra, the State Symphony Orchestra 'New Russia', The RTÉ National Symphony Orchestra, The Barcelona Symphony Orchestra, The Scottish Chamber Orchestra, BBC NOW, The National Symphony Orchestra of Colombia, The Oregon Symphony Orchestra. His Albéniz Concerto (2009) for guitar and orchestra was released on EMI Classics in November 2010. Goss wrote the first ever Theorbo Concerto, which was released on the Deux-Elles label in 2019.

Other commissions have come from: guitarists, David Russell, Xuefei Yang, Zoran Dukić and Miloš Karadaglić, the percussionist Evelyn Glennie, violinist Nicola Benedetti, flautist William Bennett, pianist Emmanuel Despax, and the tenor Ian Bostridge. Most of his music is published by Doberman Editions, Quebec, Canada.

== Musical language ==
A central theme running through Goss's work is the evocation of time (nostalgia and historical reference) and place (landscape and architecture). His uses of quotations and stylistic references help to shape his pluralist musical language, which is characterised by abrupt stylistic gear changes. As Kimberly Patterson has observed, ‘Goss’s compositional interests are in the continuum that lies between transcription and composition and in the ways in which pre-existing material can be used to create unusual and interesting music’. Goss doesn't see ‘interpretation, transcription, arrangement, improvisation, and composition as different things with distinct boundaries between them.’ He suggests that ‘the distinctions can be useful, but they are artificial… rather like the colours of the rainbow’. Jonathan Leathwood has proposed that Goss ‘denies traditional expectations of originality’ and that ‘the listener is drawn into a maze of referents’.

An interest in music and landscape dates back to two collaborations with Charles Jencks, The Garden of Cosmic Speculation (2005) (which was featured on the South Bank Show) and Frozen Music (2006) (commissioned for the opening season of the Menuhin Hall). Through these and later projects, Goss has developed ways of balancing literal and metaphorical representations of landscape, architecture, and sculpture in music.

While Goss's influences can be traced in the work of many musicians (for example, Beethoven, Mahler, Stravinsky, John Adams, Georg Rochberg, Miles Davis, Uri Caine, John Zorn, and Frank Zappa), his compositional approach owes as much to literature and the visual arts – James Joyce, Umberto Eco, Italo Calvino, Jorge Luis Borges, Gerhard Richter, Grayson Perry, Terry Gilliam, and Thomas Heatherwick. The strong literary connection in the music has been pointed out by Leathwood, who states that ‘there can be little doubt that Stephen Goss intends to provoke, among other things, thought in the form of words - verbal association and a kind of wordplay encoded in the music; not symbolism, but semiosis in the literary sense that modern thought has tended to give it, an interest in music as text’.

== Performance ==
As a guitarist, Stephen Goss has worked with many leading composers (such as Toru Takemitsu, Hans Werner Henze, Peter Maxwell Davies and Elliott Carter) and has toured and recorded extensively with the Tetra Guitar Quartet and other ensembles. He has recorded more than 20 CDs as a soloist and chamber musician and has given recitals in Europe, North and South America, and Asia. He has performed alongside Paco Peña and John Williams and has played concertos with orchestras such as the Bournemouth Sinfonietta and the English Sinfonia.

== Selected list of compositions ==
=== Orchestral, choral and large ensemble ===
- Wynwood Walls (for guitar, strings, and percussion, or guitar and string quartet) 2022 Doberman 1526
- Landscape and Memory (for two guitars and strings) 2022 Doberman 1483
- La Serenissima (for viollin and strings, or violin and string quartet) 2022 Doberman 1503
- Koblenz Concerto (for two guitars and orchestra) 2019 Doberman 1343
- The Vine-fruit Carol (for SATB choir and two guitars) 2018 Doberman 1277
- Theorbo Concerto (for theorbo and strings) 2018 Doberman 1311
- A Concerto of Colours (for guitar and wind ensemble) 2017 Doberman 1156
- Invisible Cities (for violin, guitar, strings, and percussion) 2017 Doberman 1470
- Carnival of Venice (for guitar and orchestra) 2017
- The Paganini Concerto (for guitar and orchestra) 2014 Doberman 1323
- Concerto for Five (for violin, saxophones, cello, piano, double bass and orchestra) 2013
- Piano Concerto (for piano and orchestra) 2013
- Guitar Concerto (for guitar and orchestra) 2012 Doberman 910
- Songs of the Solar System (for SSA choir, unison choir, and harp) 2012 Doberman 1302
- The Shard (for large orchestra) 2011 Doberman 895
- The Albéniz Concerto (for guitar and orchestra) 2009 Doberman 887
- Cottleston Pie (for SSAATTBB choir) 2001
- Arcadia (for nineteen solo strings) 1996
- Dreamchild (for soprano and large ensemble) 1995
- Saviour of the World (for SATB choir and organ) 1992
- Hymnen an die Nacht (for soprano solo, baritone solo and orchestra) 1985

=== Chamber music ===
- Paganini Variations (for violin, mandolin, and guitar) 2923
- Crunch Time (for viola, bass clarinet, and piano) 2019 Doberman 1495
- The Garden of Cosmic Speculation (version for violin, viola, cello and piano) 2004/2016 Doberman 1055
- The Flower of Cities (for violin, two guitars, double bass, and percussion) 2012 Doberman 852
- Northern Lights (for flute, bass clarinet doubling B flat clarinet and optional soprano saxophone, and guitar) 2010 Doberman 969
- Reflections on the Garden of Cosmic Speculation (for flute doubling piccolo & alto flute, bass clarinet doubling C clarinet and soprano saxophone, and guitar) 2010
- Variations on a Burns Air: Scherzo (for piano quartet) 2009
- Prelude and Gnossienne (for cello, piano and double bass) 2008
- Uneasy Dreams (for saxophone quartet) 2006 Doberman 1054
- Frozen Music (for guitar, violin, viola and cello) 2006 Doberman 872
- Drums and Trumpets (for six trumpets and timpani) 2005
- The Garden of Cosmic Speculation (for violin, cello, bass clarinet and piano) 2004 Doberman 1048
- Tango: The White Queen (for violin, bandoneon, guitar, piano and double bass) 2003
- Spin (for six dancers, flute, soprano saxophone, piano, guitar, sitar, video and electronics) 2003
- Trumpets and Clocks (for four trumpets, two trombones and timpani) 2002
- One-Nil (for brass quintet) 1994

=== Duos and solos ===
- Fantasia (for bandoneon and guitar) 2026
- The Big Apple Coaster (for cello and guitar) 2025
- Welsh Folksongs - set 2 (for flute and guitar) 2025
- Ophelia's Garden (for two Renaissance 8-course lute) 2025
- Preludes of Postludes (for cello and guitar) 2024 Doberman 1616
- La Catedral Sumergida (for flute and guitar) 2024 Doberman 1535
- Paganini Variations (for violin and guitar) 2023 Doberman 1532
- Intermezzi (for fortepiano and romantic guitar) 2022 Doberman 1462
- Dialogues from Invisible Cities (2022) Doberman 1456
- Exhalation (for organ) 2021 Doberman 1454
- The Lake of Time (for marimba and theorbo) 2020 Doberman 1455
- Motherlands (for soprano saxophone, or viola, and guitar) 2019 Doberman 1280
- Still Life (for cello and guitar) 2018 Doberman 1299
- Songs of Ophelia (for soprano and guitar) 2016 Doberman 1116
- The Miller's Tale (for solo theorbo) 2015 Doberman 1079
- The Book of Songs (for tenor and guitar) 2014 Doberman 986
- River Winds (for violin and piano) 2011 Doberman 983
- Caught Between (for cello and piano) 2011 Doberman 968
- The Sea of the Edge (for solo flute) 2010 Doberman 890
- American Pastoral (for violin and guitar) 2010 Doberman 952
- The Autumn Song II (for cello or flute and piano) 2010 Doberman 891
- The Autumn Song (for cello or flute and guitar) 2009 Doberman 873
- Welsh Folksongs (for voice and guitar) 2008 Doberman 989
- Welsh Folksongs (for melodic instrument and guitar) 2008 Doberman 981
- From Honey to Ashes (for flute and guitar) 2007 Doberman 1000
- Dark Knights and Holy Fools (for percussion and guitar) 2006 Doberman 953
- Park of Idols (for cello and guitar) 2005 Doberman 871
- Gymnopédies after Erik Satie (for flute and piano) 2003
- First Milonga, Last Tango (for flute and guitar) 2002 Doberman 875
- Under Milk Wood Songs (for soprano and guitar) 1990 Doberman 894
- Six Inventions (for solo cello) 1986

=== Multiple guitars ===
- Five Step Tango (for three guitars and baritone guitar) 2025
- Wessex Wyverns (for solo flute, solo guitar, and two guitar ensembles) 2025 Doberman 1633
- Aphorisms (for two guitars) 2024 Doberman 1581
- Joni (for three guitars and baritone guitar) 2022
- Cocktail List (for two guitars) 2022 Doberman 1451
- River Fragments (for two guitars) 2020 Doberman 1471
- Tarot (for four guitars and percussion) 2019 Doberman 1393
- Canción y Joropo (for four guitars) 2019 Doberman 1612
- Minimal Effort (for guitar orchestra) 2018 Doberman 1308
- Cantigas de Santiago (arranged for three guitars by Richard Wright) 2017 Doberman 1217
- Talking Drums (for two guitars) 2016 Doberman 1155
- Mahler Lieder (for four guitars) 2011 Doberman 845
- Still the Sea (for two guitars) 2009 Les Productions d’Oz 2260
- Welsh Folksongs (for two guitars) 2008 Doberman 981
- The Raw and the Cooked (for two guitars) 2004 Doberman 874
- Gnossiennes after Erik Satie (for four guitars) 2002 Doberman 947
- Lachrymae (for four guitars) 2001 Doberman 892
- Carmen Fantasy (for four guitars) 1998 Doberman
- Tempo of Three Quartered (for three eight-part guitar orchestras) 1993
- Under Milk Wood Variations (for four guitars and optional narrator) 1989 Editions Orphée 494-02831

=== Solo guitar ===
- Don Quixote 2025
- The Alchemist 2024
- Pierrot, or Harlequin? 2023 Doberman 1555
- Miami Beach 2023 Doberman 1519
- Winterbourne Preludes 2022 Doberman 1473
- Hiraeth 2020 Doberman 1374
- Perpetual Motion Machine 2020 Doberman 1395
- Happy Sad 2020
- Verismo 2020 Doberman 1442
- Bagatelles with Fantasies 2020 Doberman 1362
- Threnody 2019 Marco Tamayo Editions MAG 0012
- Time 2018 Doberman 1238
- Cinema Paradiso 2017 Doberman 1154
- Labyrinth 2016 Doberman 1036
- Sound of Iona 2016 Doberman 1030
- Watts Chapel 2015 Doberman 1013
- Sonata Capriccioso 2015 Doberman 1003
- Cantigas de Santiago 2014 Doberman 926
- Illustrations to The Book of Songs 2014 Doberman 951
- Sonatina 2013 Doberman 992
- Marylebone Elegy 2012 Doberman 866
- El Llanto de los Sueños 2007 Doberman
- The Chinese Garden 2007 Doberman
- Sonata 2006 Doberman 868
- Raise the Red Lantern 2004 Doberman 867
- Oxen of the Sun (for ten-string and six-string guitar) 2003 Doberman 870
- Looking Glass Ties 2001 Doberman 1011
- E 1996
- Three Miniatures 1986

=== Solo piano ===
- Piano Cycle 2012 Doberman 1012
- Portraits and Landscapes 2010 Doberman 893
- Rough Music (for piano and spoken voice) 2009 Doberman 1046
- Interludes 2008 Doberman 889
- invisible starfall 2003
- an ideal insomnia 2002 Doberman 996

=== Educational music ===
- Miniature Dance Suite (for solo guitar) 2021 Hebling Editions ISBN 978-3-99069-283-7
- Learn and Conquer Guitar Repertoire with Xuefei Yang (for solo guitar) 2015 Doberman 961-964
- Japanese Water Garden (for solo guitar) 2007 ABRSM 9781860967412
- Guildford Life (for flute, clarinets, recorders, percussion, guitar, bass guitar and piano) 2007
- London Masala (for clarinets, percussion, guitar, 2 vinas, sitar, 4 violins, 3 tabla players, 3 mridangams and voices) 2005
- Music Medals Pieces (for two, three and four guitars) 2003 ABRSM
- Milonga (for solo guitar) 1999 GSMD
- EGTA Series 'Solo Now' Pieces (for solo guitar) 1994 Chanterelle
- Gamelan (for two guitars) 1994 Chanterelle

== Selected list of recordings ==
=== Compositions ===
- From Honey to Ashes double album of Goss's collected music for flute and guitar, Francisco Correa and Emily Andrews, Deux-Elles DXL 1204 (2026)
- Intermezzi on 'On the Edge' Doberman Musique (2026)
- Serenity on 'Simple Truths' Gerard Cousins, Prima Classics (2026)
- A Concerto of Colours on 'Across the Horizon' Nicholas Goluses and the Eastman Wind Ensemble, Albany Records (2025)
- Welsh Folksongs on 'Songs of the Land' Estra Duo, Da Vinci Publishing (2025)
- Motherlands on 'Incantation' Wang-Zadra Duo, Are Production (2025)
- Landscape and Memory on 'Re/String' collectif9, Leaf Music (2025)
- Park of Idols on 'Atelier' Dai Miyata and Yasuji Ohagi, Denon Records (2025)
- Threnody on 'Contemporary Works for Guitar', Vincenzo Caiafa, DotGuitar (2024)
- Landscape and Memory triple album of Goss's orchestral, chamber, and solo works, Deux-Elles DXL 1202 (2024)
- Carmen Fantasy on 'Mozaik', Mozaik Guitar Quartet (2024)
- Carmen Fantasy on 'Gitana', Cuarteto Orishas (2024)
- Cantigas de Santiago on 'Cantigas' Jacopo Aversano, DotGuitar (2023)
- Joni on 'On Song' Guitar Trek, ABC Music (2023)
- Winterbourne Preludes on 'Winterbourne' Francisco Correa, Deux-Elles DXL 1200 (2023)
- Cinema Paradiso on 'Black Bile' Zoran Dukic, Guitar CoOp (2022)
- Cantigas de Santiago on 'Chinoiserie' Duo Chinoiserie, arranged for guzheng and guitar, Navona Records (2022)
- Park of Idols and Welsh Folksongs on 'Mercurial' Soazur (2021)
- Cantigas de Santiago on 'Cantigas de Santiago', David Russell, Azica Records (2021)
- Tarot on 'Tarot' Barrios Guitar Quartet (2021)
- From Honey to Ashes on 'A Different Take' Gurca White Ensemble, Big Round Records (2020)
- Watts Chapel on 'Lost to the World' Max Shaffer (2020)
- Still Life Goss's collected music for cello and guitar, Patterson/Sutton Duo, Ravello Records (2020)
- Watts Chapel on 'Como un Filo do Fumo' Michael Partington (2020)
- Carmen Fantasy on 'Pluck, Strum, Hammer' Mela Guitar Quartet (2019)
- Theorbo Concerto on 'Stephen Goss, Theorbo Concerto', Matthew Wadsworth, Scottish Chamber Orchestra, Deux-Elles (2019)
- Watts Chapel on 'Watts Chapel', Adam Khan (2018)
- The Flower of Cities on 'The Flower of Cities', John Williams and Friends, JCW (2018)
- Songs of Ophelia on 'Puertas', Adelia Issa and Edelton Gloeden, Selo Sesc (2017)
- The Miller's Tale on 'Late Night Lute', Matthew Wadsworth, Deux-Elles (2017)
- Looking Glass Ties on 'Stephen Goss Guitar Works Vol.1', Rui Mourinho, Edições Musica XXI (2016)
- Sound of Iona on 'Stephen Goss Guitar Works Vol.1', Rui Mourinho, Edições Musica XXI (2016) and 'Sound of Iona', Adam Khan (2019)
- The Book of Songs on 'Songs from our Ancestors', Ian Bostridge and Xuefei Yang, Globe Music (2016)
- Under Milk Wood Songs on 'Jarring Sounds', Danielle Reutter-Harrah and Adam Cockerham, Jarring Sounds (2014), 'Frozen Music', Jenevora Williams and Stephen Goss, Cadenza (2007)
- Guitar Concerto on 'Concerto', John Williams, Paul Daniel and the Royal Philharmonic Orchestra, JCW (2014)
- Marylebone Elegy on 'Stepping Stones', John Williams, JCW (2014)
- Mahler Lieder on 'About Time', Tetra Guitar Quartet, BGS (2013) and 'Hometown Composers' Jugend gitarren orchester, Hamburg (2018)
- Piano Concerto on 'Emmanuel Despax, piano', Thomas Carroll, Orpheus Sinfonia, Signum Classics (2013)
- Park of Idols on 'Cold Dark Matter: Music for Cello and Guitar, Kimberly Patterson and Patrick Sutton, MSR (2013), 'The Garden of Cosmic Speculation', Leonid Ghorokov and Richard Hand, Cadenza (2006)
- Circle Line (from Sonatina) on 'Kontinenti Live', Carlo Marchione, Guitar Art Festival (2012)
- Still the Sea on 'Hidden Waters', ChromaDuo, Naxos (2012)
- The Raw and the Cooked on 'Hidden Waters', ChromaDuo, Naxos (2012), 'The Raw and the Cooked', Albach Duo, Crystal Palace Records (2007), 'Songs Without Words', Hand-Dupre Duo, Cadenza (2005)
- The Albéniz Concerto on 'Rodrigo: Concierto de Aranjuez; Stephen Goss: Albéniz Concerto', Xuefei Yang, Eiji Oue, Barcelona Symphony Orchestra, EMI Classics (2010), 'Classical 2012' Virgin Classics (2011)
- Gnossiennes after Erik Satie on 'El Calor del Dia', Barrios Guitar Quartet (2011), 'Carmen', Tetra Guitar Quartet, Cadenza (2004)
- Northern Lights on 'Northern Lights', Susie Hodder-Williams, Chris Caldwell, Graham Roberts, FMR Records (2011)
- Reflections on the Garden of Cosmic Speculation on 'Northern Lights', Susie Hodder-Williams, Chris Caldwell, Graham Roberts, FMR Records (2011)
- The Sea of the Edge on 'Northern Lights', Susie Hodder-Williams, Chris Caldwell, Graham Roberts, FMR Records (2011)
- The Autumn Song on 'Northern Lights', Susie Hodder-Williams, Chris Caldwell, Graham Roberts, FMR Records (2011), 'The Autumn Song', Adam Khan (2018)
- Welsh Folksongs on 'Northern Lights', Susie Hodder-Williams, Chris Caldwell, Graham Roberts, FMR Records (2011), 'Adam Khan and Michael Bochmann', The Barn Records (2010), 'Voyage to Patagonia', Welsh Argentine Guitar Duo, WAG Records (2010), 'we only came to dream', Molly Kittle and Colin Thurmond, Eisteddfod (2008), 'Songs from Britain and America', Jenevora Williams and Stephen Goss, Tantallon Records (1991)
- Portraits and Landscapes on 'Portraits and Landscapes', Emmanuel Despax, SMCSG1 (2010)
- Uneasy Dreams on 'Uneasy Dreams', Delta Saxophone Quartet, FMR Records (2010), 'Frozen Music', Delta Saxophone Quartet, Cadenza (2007)
- Variations on a Burns Air: Scherzo on 'Sir Peter Maxwell Davies, Dimitri Smirnov, Variations on a Burns Air', Primrose Piano Quartet, Meridian (2010)
- Sonata for Guitar on 'Resonance', Michael Partington, Rosewood (2009), 'Frozen Music', Michael Partington, Cadenza (2007), 'Stephen Goss Guitar Works Vol.1', Rui Mourinho, Edições Musica XXI (2016)
- El Llanto de los Suenos on 'For David', David Russell, Telarc (2009), 'Stephen Goss Guitar Works Vol.1', Rui Mourinho, Edições Musica XXI (2016)
- Interludes on 'Préluds and Interludes', Graham Caskie, Cadenza (2008)
- Japanese Water Garden on 'Guitar Exam Pieces Grade 4', Stephen Goss, ABRSM (2009)
- Aeolian Harp on 'Guitar Exam Pieces Grade 3', Stephen Goss, ABRSM (2009)
- Gymnopédies after Erik Satie on 'Ariel', Catherine Handley and Andrew Wilson-Dixon, HAL Records (2008)
- The Chinese Garden on '40 Degrees North', Xuefei Yang, EMI Classics (2008), 'Stephen Goss Guitar Works Vol.1', Rui Mourinho, Edições Musica XXI (2016)
- Frozen Music on 'Frozen Music', Students from the Yehudi Menuhin School, Cadenza (2007)
- Dark Knights and Holy Fools on 'Frozen Music', Craig Ogden and Paul Tanner, Cadenza (2007)
- From Honey to Ashes on 'Hidden Tango', Jennifer Stinton and Richard Hand, Cadenza (2007)
- The Garden of Cosmic Speculation on 'The Garden of Cosmic Speculation', Gemini, Cadenza (2006)
- Oxen of the Sun on 'The Garden of Cosmic Speculation', Jonathan Leathwood, Cadenza (2006)
- an ideal insomnia on 'The Garden of Cosmic Speculation', Graham Caskie, Cadenza (2006)
- First Milonga, Last Tango on 'First Milonga, Last Tango', Anna Noakes and Richard Hand, quartz music (2006), 'First Milonga, Last Tango', Virginia Taylor and Timothy Kain, ABC (2017)
- Raise the Red Lantern on 'Si Ji', Xuefei Yang, GSP (2005)
- Carmen Fantasy on 'Carmen', Tetra Guitar Quartet, Cadenza (2004), 'Carmen Fantasy', Tetra Guitar Quartet, Hallmark (1999), and 'Pluck, Strum, Hammer', Mela Quartet (2018)
- Lachrymae on 'Carmen', Tetra Guitar Quartet, Cadenza (2004), and 'Tempi Moderni', Barrios Guitar Quartet (2018)
- Under Milk Wood Variations on 'TETRA', Tetra Guitar Quartet, Tantallon Records (1991), and 'Obras para cuarteto de Guitarras', Cuarteto Eunoia, Universidad Nacional de Musica, Peru (2019)

=== Arrangements ===
- Carmen Fantasy (Sarasate) on 'Violin Café' Nicola Benedetti, Decca (2025)
- Navarra (Sarasate) on 'Violin Café' Nicola Benedetti, Decca (2025)
- Polonaise de Concert Op.4 (Wieniawski) on 'Violin Café' Nicola Benedetti, Decca (2025)
- Mademoiselle de Paris (Durand) on 'Letters from Paris' Alexandra Whittingham, Decca (2025)
- She (Aznavour) on 'Letters from Paris' Alexandra Whittingham, Decca (2025)
- L'heure exquise (Hahn) on 'Letters from Paris' Alexandra Whittingham, Decca (2025)
- Assez vite, from Premières valses (Hahn) on 'Letters from Paris' Alexandra Whittingham, Decca (2025)
- Overture from Stardew Valley (Barone) on 'Eternal Fantasy' Kaori Muraji, Decca (2025)
- The Dragonborn Comes (Soule) on 'Eternal Fantasy' Kaori Muraji, Decca (2025)
- Histoire du Tango (Piazzolla) arranged for bayan, guitar, strings, and percussion on 'History of Tango', Russian National Orchestra, Prima Classics (2024)
- Alborada del gracioso (Ravel) on 'Ravel, Debussy, Music for two guitars', ChromaDuo, Naxos (2016)
- Libertango (Piazzolla) on 'The Classical Album 2015', Decca (2014), 'Cancion', Deutsche Grammophon (2013), 'Bravo! The Classical Album 2014', Deutsche Grammophon (2013), 'Guitar Moods' Deutsche Grammophon (2013), 'Latino Gold' Deutsche Grammophon (2013), 'The Classical Album 2013', Decca (2013), 'Latino', Deutsche Grammophon (2012), Milos Karadaglić
- Four Pieces from the First Book of Consort Lessons (Thomas Morley) on 'About Time', Tetra Guitar Quartet, BGS (2013)
- Bolero (Ravel) on 'Cancion', Deutsche Grammophon (2013), 'Guitar Moods' Deutsche Grammophon (2013), 'Latino Gold' Deutsche Grammophon (2013), Miloš Karadaglić
- De Usuahia a la Quiana (Santaolalla) on 'Latino Gold' Deutsche Grammophon (2013), 'Cancion', Deutsche Grammophon (2013), 'Guitar Moods' Deutsche Grammophon (2013), Miloš Karadaglić
- Quizás, quizás, quizás (Farré) on 'Cancion', Deutsche Grammophon (2013), 'Latino Gold' Deutsche Grammophon (2013), 'Latino', Deutsche Grammophon (2012), Miloš Karadaglić
- Theme from Stephen Ward (Lloyd Webber) on 'Theme from Stephen Ward', Miloš Karadaglić, Deutsche Grammophon (2013)
- Oblivion (Piazzolla) on 'Latino Gold' Deutsche Grammophon (2013), 'Latino', Deutsche Grammophon (2012), Miloš Karadaglić
- Por una cabeza (Gardel) on 'Latino Gold' Deutsche Grammophon (2013), 'Latino', Deutsche Grammophon (2012), Miloš Karadaglić
- La Cumparsita (Rodriguez) on 'Latino', Miloš Karadaglić, Deutsche Grammophon (2012)
- Navarra (Sarasate) on 'The Best of the Classical Brits', David Garrett, Valeriy Sokolov, Xuefei Yang, David Charles Abell, London Concert Orchestra, Mail on Sunday (2008)
- Capriccio Espagnol (Rimsky-Korsakov) on 'Carmen Fantasy', Tetra Guitar Quartet, Hallmark (1999)
- Winter (Vivaldi) on 'Vivaldi Four Seasons', Tetra GUItar Quartet, Carlton Classics (1996)
- Concerto in D RV93 (Vivaldi) on 'Vivaldi Four Seasons', Tetra GUItar Quartet, Carlton Classics (1996)
- Silent Night (Gruber) on 'The Choirboy's Christmas', Anthony Way and the Choir of St Paul's Cathedral, Decca (1996)
- Façade (Walton) on 'By Arrangement', Tetra Guitar Quartet, Conifer (1993), 'TETRA', Tetra Guitar Quartet, Tantallon Records (1991)
- Suite from Lieutenant Kijé (Prokofiev) on 'By Arrangement', Tetra Guitar Quartet, Conifer (1993)
- Threepenny Opera Suite (Weill) on 'By Arrangement', Tetra Guitar Quartet, Conifer (1993)
- Five Songs (Ives) on 'Songs from Britain and America', Jenevora Williams and Stephen Goss, Tantallon Records (1991)

=== As a guitarist ===
- About Time Tetra Guitar Quartet, BGS (2013)
- Russian Guitar Music with Carl Herring, audio-b (2011)
- Guitar Exam Pieces Grades 3&4 ABRSM (2009)
- Guitar Exam Pieces Grades 1&2 with Richard Hand, ABRSM (2009)
- Ave Maris Stella with Gemini, Metier (2008)
- Frozen Music with Jenevora Williams, Cadenza (2006)
- Watersmeet with the Tetra and Aquarelle Guitar Quartets, the Appassionata Trio, Jonathan Leathwood and Richard Wright, Cadenza (2006)
- Carmen Tetra Guitar Quartet, Cadenza (2004)
- The Selevan Story The St Levan Ensemble, ESG Records (1997)
- Carmen Fantasy Tetra Guitar Quartet, Hallmark (1999)
- Vivaldi, Four Seasons Tetra Guitar Quartet, Carlton Classics (1996)
- The Choirboy's Christmas with the Choir of St Paul's Cathedral, Decca (1996)
- Red Leaves The Brunel Ensemble, Cala Records (1996)
- By Arrangement Tetra Guitar Quartet, Conifer Classics (1993)
- Songs from Britain and America with Jenevora Williams, Tantallon Records (1991)
- TETRA Tetra Guitar Quartet, Tantallon Records (1991)
