= Mandeep Dhami =

Clinical psychologist and academic

Mandeep Kaur Dhami
- Education: Brunel University of London; University of Leicester; City University, London
- Scientific career
- Workplaces: Middlesex University; Defence Science and Technology Laboratory; University of Cambridge; University of Victoria; University of Maryland, College Park
- Thesis: Bailing and jailing the fast and frugal way : an application of social judgement theory and simple heuristics to English magistrates' remand decisions (2001)

Mandeep K. Dhami is a British clinical psychologist who is a professor in psychology at Middlesex University. Her research considers decision making strategies and the factors that influence perceptions of risk.

== Early life and education ==
Dhami studied psychology at Brunel University of London. She moved to the University of Leicester for her graduate studies, and earned a master's degree in criminology in 1996. She has said her experiences in criminology and psychology prepared her for a career in science and social policy. Dhami was a doctoral researcher at City University, London. Her doctorate explored frugal strategies to bailing and jailing. During her doctorate Dhami, worked at the Max Planck Institute for Human Development. She moved to the University of Maryland, College Park for a postdoctoral position, before joining the University of Victoria as a Research Fellow.

== Research and career ==
In 2005, Dhami joined the University of Cambridge as a lecturer in criminology. Dhami spent a year as the Principal Social Psychologist at Defence Science and Technology Laboratory. She moved to the University of Surrey in 2011, where she was promoted to Reader. She is a professor of psychology at Middlesex University, where she investigates decision making and the factors that influence people's perception of risk. She was worked in criminal courts and intelligence analysis. Alongside academic roles, Dhami has held positions in two prisons, where she studied the process of mediation in prisons.

Dhami was awarded the 2020 NATO SAS Panel Excellence Award.

== Selected publications ==
- Mandeep K Dhami; Ralph Hertwig; Ulrich Hoffrage (1 November 2004). "The role of representative design in an ecological approach to cognition". Psychological Bulletin. 130 (6): 959–988. doi:10.1037/0033-2909.130.6.959. ISSN 0033-2909. PMID 15535744. Wikidata Q34366512.
- Mandeep K Dhami (1 March 2003). "Psychological models of professional decision making". Psychological Science. 14 (2): 175–180. doi:10.1111/1467-9280.01438. ISSN 0956-7976. PMID 12661681. Wikidata Q52107466.
- Rocio Garcia-Retamero; Mandeep K Dhami (1 February 2009). "Take-the-best in expert-novice decision strategies for residential burglary". Psychonomic Bulletin and Review. 16 (1): 163–169. doi:10.3758/pbr.16.1.163. ISSN 1069-9384. PMID 19145028. Wikidata Q51942505.
