= Joachim Engel =

German scientist and a professor

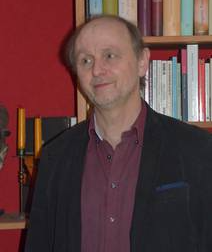
- Joachim Engel
- Born: January 1954; Bad Orb, Germany
- Scientific career
- Fields: Mathematics, mathematics education, statistics

Joachim Engel (born 1954) is a German scientist and a professor. Since 2006 he has been professor of Mathematics and Mathematical Education at the Ludwigsburg University of Education, after two years as a Professor of Mathematical Education at Leibniz University Hannover (2004–2006). Before becoming a professor he worked as a research fellow at the University of Heidelberg in applied mathematics and the University of Bonn in Economics and was a Visiting Assistant Professor at the University of Michigan in Ann Arbor.

== Training ==
Engel obtained a German Diploma in Mathematics in 1977 and teaching credentials as a high school teacher (Mathematics and Theology) at the University of Bonn. After his graduation he joined Eirene – International Christian Service for Peace and worked as volunteer with troubled teenagers in Ohio and with a community serving the homeless in Los Angeles. Back to academic life, he obtained a master's degree at the University of Southern California in 1986 and his PhD in applied mathematics in 1988. He then worked in the US and Germany as a research fellow and obtained his German Habilitation in mathematics education from Ludwigsburg University in 1998.

== Academic contributions ==
In his early work Joachim Engel specialized in nonparametric curve estimation and signal detection applying methods of harmonic analysis (Engel, 1994) (Engel & Kneip 1996) and kernel regression to biomedical growth curves and economics. Recently he is best known for his contributions in Statistics Education, investigating students’ comprehension of randomness and variability (Engel & Sedlmeier 2005) and introducing computer intensive methods, based, for instance, on bootstrap procedures (Engel & Grübel, 2008). His experience on didactical methods for explaining functions and their uses for modeling real world problems is reflected in his widely used highly successful textbook on applying functions for modeling based on data. He also wrote a well-known textbook on Complex Variables.

He has been an active member of the International Association for Statistical Education (IASE) and a coordinator of ProCivicStat (www.procivicstat.org), a strategic Partnership sponsored under the Erasmus+ program of the EU, aimed and empowering people to understand statistics about society. Since September 2019 he is president of IASE.

== Books ==
- Engel, Joachim (2010). Anwendungsorientierte Mathematik: Von Daten zur Funktion : Eine Einführung in die mathematische Modellbildung für Lehramtsstudierende (in German). Berlin, Heidelberg: Springer-Verlag Berlin Heidelberg. ISBN 978-3-540-89087-4. OCLC 699592969.
- Engel, Joachim (2009). Komplexe Zahlen und ebene Geometrie. Oldenbourg Verlag. doi:10.1524/9783486598582. ISBN 978-3-486-59858-2.
- Engel, Joachim (1999). Tree structured function estimation with Haar wavelets. Hamburg: Verlag Dr. Kovač. ISBN 3-86064-884-5. OCLC 47297478.

== Articles ==
- Engel, Joachim (2016). "Funktionen, Daten und Modelle: Vernetzende Zugänge zu zentralen Themen der (Schul-)Mathematik". Journal für Mathematik-Didaktik (in German). 37 (1). Springer Science and Business Media LLC: 107–139. doi:10.1007/s13138-016-0094-4. ISSN 0173-5322. S2CID 256047815.
- Kneip, Alois; Engel, Joachim (1 April 1995). "Model Estimation in Nonlinear Regression Under Shape Invariance". The Annals of Statistics. 23 (2). Institute of Mathematical Statistics. doi:10.1214/aos/1176324535. ISSN 0090-5364.
