= Art Deco (disambiguation) =

Art Deco is a visual arts and architectural style popularized in the 1920s.

Art Deco may also refer to:

- Art Deco (album), a 1988 album by Don Cherry
- "Art Deco", a song from the Lana Del Rey album Honeymoon

== See also ==
- Art Nouveau, an art style preceding Art Deco
