= Deco Refreshments, Inc. =

American restaurant chain

Deco Refreshments, Inc. was a restaurant chain in Buffalo, New York which operated 39 restaurants in 1929. It was started in December 1926 with an initial capitalization of $150,000. This increased to $250,000 in February 1928. Deco Refreshments, Inc., it experienced major growth in the late 1920s and early 1930s. Its stock was popular and was included in the portfolio of the Niagara Share Corporation, which held 7,580 shares of Deco Refreshments, Inc., in February 1931.

== History ==
The story began with a young man who just wanted to earn some tuition for his college in the summer of 1918, Gregory Deck borrowed an old kitchen table and started his business. From selling hot dogs at the stand at the very beginning to the later delivering van which brought hot dogs, waffle batter, or hamburgers to homes in Buffalo.

== Expansion ==
The business planned an expansion to a total of fifty restaurants. Fourteen locations were opened by the company in the first half of 1929, with fourteen more under construction. Sales rose to $395,315 in the first five months of 1929, compared with $174,313 over a like period of 1928. Profits grew from $10,900 from January to May 1928 to a total of $28,750 during the same months in 1929.

Though Deco finally sold and ended its business for various reasons, it still made a historical legacy in Buffalo.
