= Gustavo Deco =

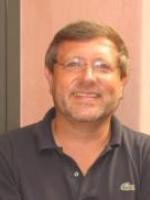
- Professor Gustavo Deco
- Born: Rosario, Argentina
- Awards: Siemens "Inventor of the Year" (2001)
- Scientific career
- Fields: Neuroscience, Cognitive Science
- Workplaces: Pompeu Fabra University

Gustavo Deco is an Argentinian and Italian professor and scientist. He serves as Research Professor at the Catalan Institution for Research and Advanced Studies and Full Professor (Catedratico) at the Pompeu Fabra University, where he is Director of the Center of Brain and Cognition and head of the Computational Neuroscience Group. In 2001, Deco was awarded the international prize of Siemens "Inventor of the Year" for his contributions in statistical learning, models of visual perception, and fMRI based diagnosis of neuropsychiatric diseases..

== Training ==
Deco holds three doctorates in interrelated disciplines. A Ph.D. in physics from the National University of Rosario (Argentina) (1987), a habilitation in Computer Science from the Technical University of Munich (1997), and a PhD in psychology from LMU Munich (2001). These degrees were obtained whilst holding a number of research posts. In 1987, he held a post-doctoral fellowship at the University of Bordeaux. In 1988 and 1999, he was a postdoc fellow at the Alexander von Humboldt Foundation at the University of Giessen in Germany. From 1993-2003 he led the Computational Neuroscience Group in the Neural Computing Section of the Siemens Corporate Research Center in Munich, Germany.

Deco has held lecturing posts at Rosario, Frankfurt and Munich and, since 2001, invited lecturer post at LMU Munich. He was associate professor at the Technical University of Munich and honorary professor at the University of Rosario in 1998. From 2001-2009, he was a McDonnell-Pew Visiting Fellow at the Centre for Cognitive Neuroscience at the University of Oxford.

== Academic contributions ==
Deco has made important contributions to a number of topics including computational neuroscience, neuropsychology, psycholinguistics, biological networks, statistical formulation of neural networks, and chaos theory. His most highly cited research focuses on whole-computational modelling of ongoing spontaneous activity in resting-state networks, and thus providing a causal understanding of these important networks in health and disease. Deco is currently investigating these research questions in his advanced ERC grant “The Dynamical and Structural Basis of Human Mind Complexity: Segregation and Integration of Information and Processing in the Brain”.

In his research, Deco has used large-scale cortical models where the networks teeter on the edge of instability. In this state, the functional networks are in a low-firing stable state while they are continuously pulled towards multiple other configurations. Small extrinsic perturbations can shape task-related network dynamics, whereas perturbations from intrinsic noise generate excursions reflecting the range of available functional networks. This is particularly advantageous for the efficiency and speed of network mobilization. Thus, the resting state reflects the dynamical capabilities of the brain, which emphasizes the vital interplay of time and space. Ongoing research concentrates on characterizing these functional and structural networks in health and disease with a view to creating a new discipline of computational neuropsychiatry.

== Bibliography ==
Books

- G. Deco and D. Obradovic (1996) "An Information-Theoretic Approach to Neural Computing", Springer Verlag, New York.
- G. Deco and B. Schürmann (2000) "Information Dynamics: Foundations and Applications", Springer Verlag, New York.
- E. Rolls and G. Deco (2001) "Computational Neuroscience of Vision", Oxford University Press, Oxford.
- E. Rolls and G. Deco (2010) "The Noisy Brain", Oxford University Press, Oxford.

Articles

List of All Publications

== Sources ==
External links

Computational Neuroscience Group

== See also ==
- Biologically inspired computing
- Connectome
- Resting state fMRI
