= Adolescent egocentrism =

Developmental psychology term

Adolescent egocentrism is a term that child psychologist David Elkind used to describe the phenomenon of adolescents' inability to distinguish between their perception of what others think about them and what people actually think in reality. Elkind's theory on adolescent egocentrism is drawn from Piaget's theory on cognitive developmental stages, which argues that formal operations enable adolescents to construct imaginary situations and abstract thinking.

Accordingly, adolescents are able to conceptualize their own thoughts and conceive of others perception of their self-image. However, Elkind pointed out that adolescents tend to focus mostly on their own perceptions – especially on their behaviors and appearance – because of the "physiological metamorphosis" they experience during this period. This leads to adolescents' belief that society is just as attentive to their actions and semblance as they are of themselves. According to Elkind, adolescent egocentrism results in two consequential mental constructions, namely imaginary audience and personal fable.

== Mental constructions ==
=== Imaginary audience ===
Elkind used the term imaginary audience to describe the phenomenon that an adolescent anticipates the reactions of other people to them in actual or impending social situations. Elkind argued that this kind of anticipation could be explained by the adolescent's preoccupation that others are as admiring or as critical of them as they are of themself. As a result, an audience is created, as the adolescent believes that they will be the focus of attention.

However, more often than not the audience is imaginary because in actual social situations always being the focus of public attention is not usually the case. Elkind believed that the construction of imaginary audiences would partially account for a wide variety of typical adolescent behaviors and experiences; and imaginary audiences played a role in the self-consciousness that emerges in early adolescence. It is privy to their own knowledge of themself, however — since the audience is usually the adolescent's own construction.

According to Elkind, the notion of imaginary audience helps to explain why adolescents usually seek privacy and feel reluctant to reveal themselves – it is a reaction to the feeling that one is constantly under the critical scrutiny of others.

=== Personal fable ===
Elkind addressed that adolescents have a complex set of beliefs that their own feelings are unique and they are special and immortal. He used the term Personal fable to describe this notion, which is the complement of the construction of imaginary audience. Since an adolescent usually fails to differentiate their focus on their own perceptions and that of others, they tend to believe that they are of great importance to those around them (the imaginary audience), and consequently come to regard their feelings as something special and unique. This belief of personal uniqueness and invincibility contributes to an illusion that they are above the rules, disciplines and laws that apply to other people; isolation can be a way to show individuality in this mindset. Due to the existence of personal fable at some point, adolescents tend to substitute the roles of an idol, a hero or even a god with their own image.

== Passing ==
Elkind believed that adolescent egocentrism was a temporary phenomenon that will gradually diminish as adolescents grow older. The reason for this, Elkind argued, was because after entering the formal operational stage, no new mental systems would develop. Therefore, the mental structures formed during adolescence would continue to function for the rest of the life span. Accordingly, the two mental constructions that result from egocentrism, imaginary audience and personal fable, will gradually be overcome and disappear as formal operations become mature and stable.

=== Passing of imaginary audience ===
The imaginary audience, Elkind said, could be regarded as "a series of hypotheses" that an adolescent "tests against reality". Because the imaginary audience is usually constructed based on an adolescent's attention on his own perception, it will be gradually modified through communicating and reacting with real audiences. Eventually, adolescents will be able to recognize the difference between their own preoccupations and concerns of others.

=== Passing of personal fable ===
As to the passing of personal fable, Elkind's idea was drawn from Erikson's (1959) stages of psychosocial development. An establishment of what Erikson called "intimacy" could account for the elimination of personal fable, because during the process of establishing "intimacy", adolescents have to constantly adjust their imaginary audiences to the real ones. As a result, adolescents are able to see themselves in a more realistic way and to establish meaningful interpersonal relationships.

== Discussions ==
A lot of research has examined different dimensions of Elkind's concept of adolescent egocentrism, however, the findings have not well supported the concept. According to this research, the manifestation of adolescent egocentrism is not a normative developmental phenomenon that occurs only during adolescence, but varies across different contexts. Main discussions from current literature focus on three aspects: whether adolescent egocentrism is age-related; whether adolescent egocentrism has association with formal operations; whether adolescent egocentrism weigh equally across genders.

=== Not being age-related ===
In his 1967 work, Elkind claimed that adolescent egocentrism emerges during early adolescence (age 11–12) and gradually dissipates throughout middle and late adolescence. However, some findings from later studies indicate that this statement is not necessarily to be accurate. In 1986, Lapsley and his colleagues conducted two studies to examine the theoretical assumptions brought up by Elkind. In their first study they collected data from a sample that included 45 sixth graders, 39 eighth graders, 50 tenth graders and 49 twelfth graders. They used the Adolescent Egocentrism Scale (AES) developed by Enright et al. (1979, 1980) and paper-and-pencil battery of formal operations tasks developed by Lunzer (1965) as measuring instruments to examine the correlation between adolescent egocentrism and formal operational thought.

If Elkind's assumption were right, the correlation was supposed to change from positive to negative as the grade increased and the magnitude of the correlation should decrease with age. The results of the study obtained only significant negative correlation in late adolescence and non-significant change in the magnitude of the correlation. The results didn't support the Elkind's claim that adolescent egocentrism emerges in early adolescence and decreases linearly throughout middle and late adolescence. In other words, adolescents aged 11 or 12 could experience adolescent egocentrism of the same magnitude as those aged 15 or 16 do. Another study by Frankenberger (2000) also provides evidence that adolescent egocentrism is not age-related.

In this study, a survey was conducted for data collection from 223 adolescents and 131 adults. The survey contained measures of three aspects: adolescent egocentrism, self-consciousness, and interpersonal reactivity. The result revealed that scores of egocentrism were not, on average, significantly different between adolescents and young adults (19-30), which indicates that egocentrism in adolescence may continue into adulthood.

=== Little association with formal operations ===
An important theoretical assumption in Elkind's theory is that the emergence of adolescence egocentrism is a result of the development of formal operational thoughts. Nevertheless, some studies had findings that were contrast to Elkind's position. Lapsley and his colleagues conducted two studies to examine the theoretical assumptions in 1986. In the second study, they analyzed the data obtained from two samples: a sample of 7th-, 9th-and 11th-graders and another sample of college undergraduate students. They used Adolescent Egocentrism Scale (AES) (Enright et al., 1979, 1980), Lunzer (1965) formal operations measure and Imaginary Audience Scale (IAS) (Elkind & Bowen, 1979) as the instruments.

The result of a grade-by-grade analysis of inter-correlations between adolescence egocentrism and formal operational thoughts showed modest to non-significant differences among all the measures, which implies that there is little association between adolescent egocentrism and formal operations. Some more recent studies got similar findings. Heather et al. (1993) found that formal operations were not an effective indicator of both imaginary audience and personal fable. Galanaki (2012) performed a research to investigate the association of adolescent egocentrism with age, gender, pubertal development and formal operational thoughts.

=== Gender differences ===
A considerable number of studies have found gender differences in egocentrism (Smetana, J.G.&VillaLobos M., 2010). Kimberly A Schonert-Reichl's (1994) study on the relationship between depressive symptomatology and adolescent egocentrism recruited 62 adolescents (30 males, 32 females) aged from 12 to 17. The study used Reynolds Adolescent Depression Scale (RADS), Imaginary Audience Scale (IAS) and the New Personal Fable Scale (NPFS) as measuring tools. The results revealed significantly higher scores obtained by females compared with males in the Transient Self subscale in IAS.

Transient Self, as defined by Elkind and Bowen in 1979, refers to impermanent image of self that is mainly relative to one-time behaviors and temporary appearance. Thus, adolescent females have a higher tendency to consider themselves to be different from others, and tend to be more self-conscious in situations that involve momentary embarrassments (e.g. going to a party with a bad haircut), than their male peers. Another study conducted by Goossens and Beyers (1992) using similar measuring instruments found that boys have stronger beliefs that they are unique, invulnerable and sometimes omnipotent, which are typical characteristics of personal fable.

== See also ==
- Imaginary audience
- Personal fable
