= Spotlight effect =

Cognitive bias in which people think they are being noticed more than they really are

A woman experiences the Spotlight Effect by believing she is being noticed by those around her. The audience is actually paying attention to a performance by the rock and roll band Fleetwood Mac.

The spotlight effect is the psychological phenomenon by which people tend to believe they are being noticed more than they really are. As individuals are often at the center of their own world, an accurate evaluation of how much they are noticed by others is uncommon. The reason for the spotlight effect is a cognitive bias which overlooks the fact that individuals are unlikely to be at the center of everyone else's world. This tendency is especially prominent when an individual does something atypical, such as committing a faux pas.

Research has empirically shown that such drastic over-estimation of one's effect on others is widely common. Many professionals in social psychology encourage people to be conscious of the spotlight effect and to allow this phenomenon to moderate the extent to which one believes one is in a social spotlight.

== History ==
The term "spotlight effect" was coined by Thomas Gilovich, Victoria Husted Medvec, and Kenneth Savitsky. The phenomenon made its first appearance in the world of psychology in the journal Current Directions in Psychological Science in 1999. Although this was the first time the effect was termed, it was not the first time it had been described. There were other studies done before 1999 that had looked at phenomena similar to the spotlight effect that Gilovich, Husted Medvec, and Savitsky described. Thomas Gilovich had been studying this phenomenon for many years and wrote other research papers in the years leading up to his work with Savitsky. In his study with Husted Medvec and Savitsky, he combined the different effects he had observed previously to describe the spotlight. Gilovich was not the only one who had noticed this occurrence of the spotlight effect. David Kenny and Bella DePaulo conducted a study that looked at whether or not people knew how others view them. Kenny and DePaulo thought that individuals would base what others thought of them using their own self-perceptions rather than other feedback given to them. The study found that individuals' views of what others think of them is variable compared to what is actually thought of them.

As an example of the spotlight effect, Kleck and Strenta (1980) examined how subjects perceived reactions to them having a physical disfigurement. In their study, volunteers had a cosmetic effect applied to their face which had the appearance of a prominent facial scar. The volunteer was shown the scar in a mirror. The makeup artist then applied a "cream" to "prevent the scar from drying out". The volunteer then went in to a second room where they were instructed to have a normal conversation with another person on a given topic. On return, the volunteer rated their perceived reaction to "having a scar": whether they perceived the other person as being more tense than normal, making less eye contact, being more distant, more patronizing, etc. The results were that the volunteers perceived that they were treated significantly "differently" because of the scar. In reality, however, when the "cream" was applied before they entered the room, the scar was removed entirely by the makeup artist, without the volunteer realizing it. Thus the perception of being treated differently was entirely due to the volunteer's self-consciousness.

=== Ties to other psychological concepts ===
The spotlight effect is an extension of several psychological phenomena. Among these is the phenomenon known as anchoring and adjustment, which suggests that individuals will use their own internal feelings of anxiety and the accompanying self-representation as an anchor, then insufficiently correct for the fact that others are less privy to those feelings than they are themselves. Consequently, they overestimate the extent to which their anxiety is obvious to onlookers. In fact, Clark and Wells (1995) suggest that socially phobic people enter social situations in a heightened self-focused state, namely, from a raised emotional anchor. This self-focused state makes it difficult for individuals to set aside public and private self-knowledge to focus on the task.

Another related phenomenon is called the false-consensus effect. The false-consensus effect occurs when individuals overestimate the extent to which other people share their opinions, attitudes, and behavior. This leads to a false conclusion which will increase someone's self-esteem. The false-consensus effect is the opposing theory to the false-uniqueness effect, which is the tendency of one to underestimate the extent to which others share the same positive attitudes and behavior. Either of these effects can be applied to the spotlight effect.

The self-as-target bias is another closely linked phenomenon with the spotlight effect. This concept describes when someone believes that events are disproportionately directed towards him or herself. For example, if a student had an assignment due in class and did not prepare as well as they should have, the student may start to panic and think that simply because they did not prepare well, the teacher will know and call on them for answers.

Also relevant to the spotlight effect is the illusion of transparency (sometimes called the observer's illusion of transparency), which is people's tendency to overestimate the degree to which their personal mental state is known by others. Another manifestation of the illusion of transparency is a tendency for people to overestimate how well they understand others' personal mental states. This cognitive bias is similar to the illusion of asymmetric insight, in which people perceive their knowledge of others to surpass other people's knowledge of themselves.

Other related concepts are egocentric bias, self-referential encoding, self-reference effect and ideas of reference and delusions of reference.

== Research ==
The spotlight effect plays a significant role in many different aspects of psychology and society. Primarily, research on this phenomenon has been pioneered by four individuals: Thomas Gilovich, Kenneth Savitsky, Victoria Medvec, and Thomas Kruger. The main focuses of their research center around social judgments, salience of individual contributions, actions of individuals, and how individuals believe others perceive them.

=== Social judgment and salience ===
In social judgment, embarrassment plays a considerable role in the degree to which the spotlight effect is manifested. Research by Asif, Medvec, and Savitsky indicated that certain situations in which perceivably embarrassing items are factors, such as an embarrassing t-shirt, increase the extent to which the spotlight effect is experienced by an individual. The timing of the exposure during a perceivably embarrassing situation also plays a role in the severity of the spotlight effect. If the exposure is immediate, the spotlight effect significantly increases in decision making scenarios. Delayed exposure, however, decreases spotlight effect intensity.

Salience of ideas and important contributions within a group are additional aspects of social judgment that are affected by the spotlight effect. Individuals tend to overestimate the extent to which their contributions make an impact on those around them. In a group setting, those contributions are thought of by the individual as being more significant than the contributions of their group members and that the other members believe the same about that individual's contributions.

=== Actions and perceptions ===
Actions of individuals and how they believe others perceive their performance also plays an important part of spotlight effect research. Gilovich, Medvec, and Savitsky further explored this idea. In situations that involve large, interacting groups, a common detail identifies the reason attention of others is not solely focused on the individual. In these settings, like a class lecture or athletic competition, attention is divided between focusing on the individual and on the actions of the group. The inability to identify the split attention leads individuals to overestimate the likelihood that their peers will perceive them poorly.

Similarly, Gilovich, Medvec, and Savitsky further elaborated upon their research and concluded that in situations involving an audience member whose sole purpose is to observe, the severity of the spotlight effect is not overestimated because the focus of an audience's attention is centered upon the individual performing.

== See also ==
- Imaginary audience
- Self-consciousness
- Social projection
- Personal fable
