= National Association for the Education of Young Children =

Nonprofit organization in Washington D.C., United States

- Founded: 1926 in Washington, D.C.
- Headquarters: Washington, D.C.,
- Key people: Ann McClain Terrell, President
- Revenue: 18,387,025 United States dollar (2022)
- Total assets: 57,803,063 United States dollar (2022)
- Members: Nearly 60,000 (2020)
- Website: www.naeyc.org

The National Association for the Education of Young Children (NAEYC) is a large nonprofit association in the United States representing early childhood education teachers, para-educators, center directors, trainers, college educators, families of young children, policy makers, and advocates. NAEYC is focused on improving the well-being of young children, with particular emphasis on the quality of educational and developmental services for children from birth through age 8.

== History ==
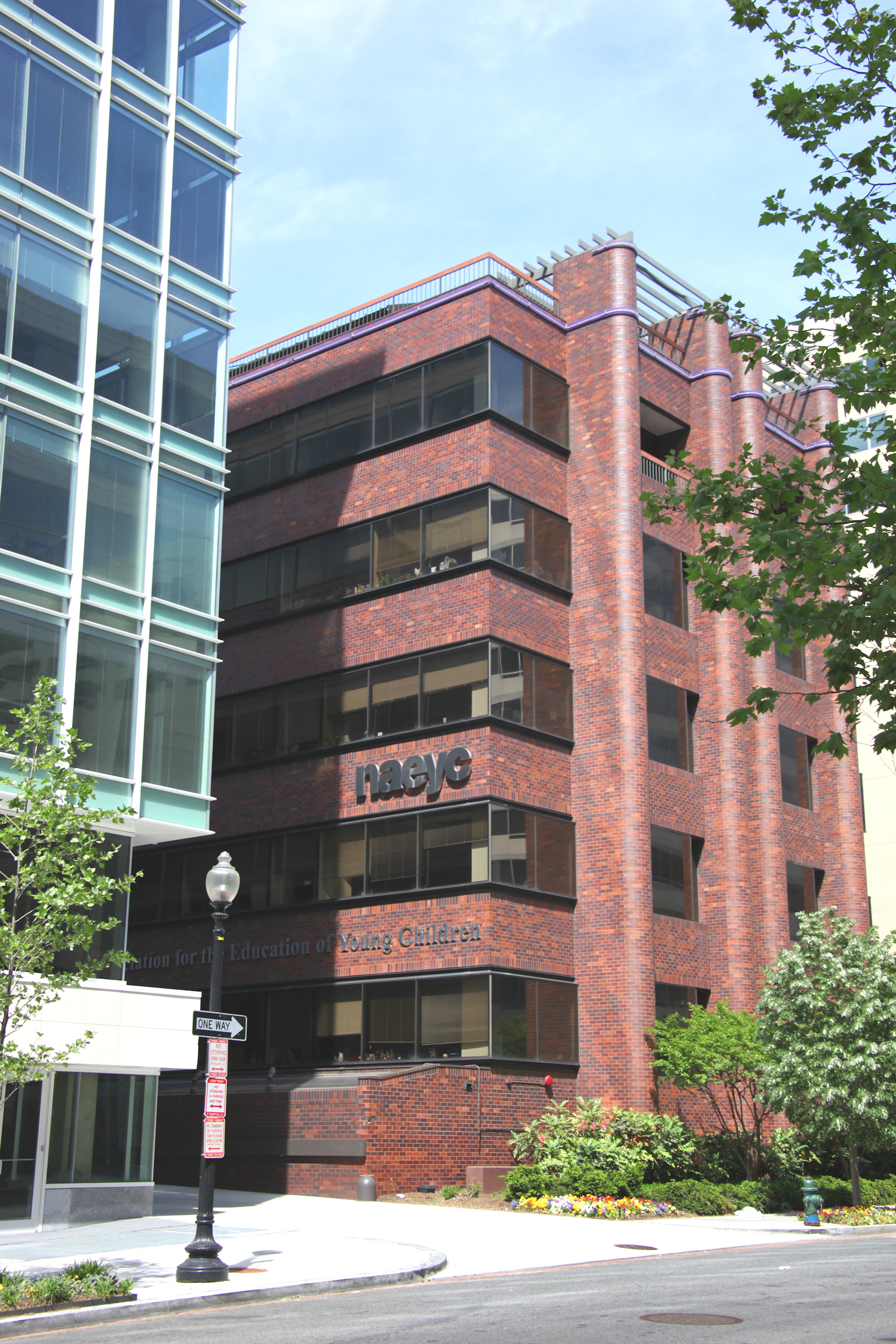
The NAEYC building at 1313 L Street NW in Washington, D.C.

In the 1920s, concern over the varying quality of emerging nursery school programs in the United States inspired Patty Smith Hill to gather prominent figures in the field to decide how to best ensure the existence of high-quality programs. Meeting in Washington, DC, the group negotiated the issue of a manual, called "Minimum Essentials for Nursery Education," that set out standards and methods of acceptable nursery schools. Three years later, the group cemented the existence of a professional association of nursery school experts named the National Association for Nursery Education (NANE). NANE changed its name to NAEYC in 1964.

The association has existed for over 90 years. It holds three national early childhood conferences per year, the NAEYC Annual Conference, the NAEYC Public Policy Forum and the NAEYC Professional Learning Institute. The NAEYC Annual Conference is the largest early childhood education conference in the world. The association publishes periodicals, books, professional development materials, and resources, all of which relate to the education of young children. The association is also active in public policy work. The association is well known for accrediting high-quality child care/preschool centers, and more than 10,000 centers, programs and schools have earned NAEYC accreditation.

== Accreditation ==
NAEYC accredits early childhood programs according to health, safety and education standards it first launched in 1985 and modified and released in September 2006. The new standards were intended to provide a more reliable and accountable accreditation system and to encourage the field of early childhood education to strive for a new level of excellence.

NAEYC also accredits academic degree programs for early childhood educators.

== Structure ==
NAEYC has a structure of state and local Affiliates that are semi-autonomous but that are required to contribute part of the membership dues to the national organization. The Office of Affiliate Relations provides direct services to NAEYC State Affiliates and Regional Affiliates to support them in their efforts to build capacity and become high-performing, inclusive organizations.

== Current programs ==
NAEYC provides many different programs to assist professionals who work to educate young children. They are a leading publisher of educational resources, which include books, videos and posters that can assist in the teaching of young children. NAEYC also publishes a scholarly journal to help early childhood professionals and parents stay informed about the latest research on educating children age 0-8, Young Children. In 2007, NAEYC also developed Teaching Young Children, a magazine written for preschool teachers. The magazine provides useful, research-based ideas that teachers can use in their classrooms. Every year the NAEYC offers several conferences where participants can learn about and receive professional development in their field as well as focus on the improvements that have been made in the practices, policies and research.

Another important program sponsored by the NAEYC is the "Week of the Young Child". This is a week-long promotion every spring that brings public awareness to the importance of early childhood development and education.

== Policy and advocacy ==
NAEYC encourages its supporters to be informed of current issues and legislation that affect the lives of young children. At the NAEYC Children's Champions Action Center, individuals can find information about the federal legislative process, learn how to contact members of Congress, and see the daily agenda for the House and the Senate.

NAEYC aims to develop an integrated system of early childhood care and education that includes comprehensive approaches that directly involve families and communities in program design, implementation, and evaluation with the goal that Americans can invest now in our children and families and enjoy long-term savings, with a more vibrant nation of healthy, achieving children and more stable families.

Federal, state and local government, communities, parents, and the private sector must share in the responsibility of ensuring the well-being of children and families.

In order to keep the programs going, NAEYC members must pay dues for funding of the programs they run.

== Journals, publications and position statements ==
The following periodic publications are released and sponsored by NAEYC:

Young Children

Young Children is a peer reviewed journal published bi-monthly by the National Association for the Education of Young Children. In this journal, issues are organized around topical clusters that devote special attention to issues in the field of early childhood education.

Teaching Young Children

Teaching Young Children is a magazine specifically designed for preschool teachers. It highlights current thinking on best practices in early childhood education, innovations in the field, research and its implications, and interesting ideas for and from preschool teachers. The articles and other features reinforce the accreditation criteria for the NAEYC Early Childhood Program Standards on Relationships and Teaching and encourage effective teaching in the preschool years.

Previously Published

Early Childhood Research Quarterly

Early Childhood Research Quarterly is a research journal that is published four times a year, and contains current research in early childhood.

In addition to these periodicals, NAEYC produces formal position statements from time to time to "state the Association's position on issues related to early childhood education practice, policy, and/or professional development for which there are controversial or critical opinions." These position statements are typically produced by NAEYC to include in-depth discussion of specific issues such as Early Learning Standards, Teacher Certification or Media Violence. In a few instances, NAEYC has issued position statements jointly with other authorities. A recent example is the 2012 position statement titled "Technology and Interactive Media as Tools in Early Childhood Programs Serving Children from Birth through Age 8", produced jointly with the Fred Rogers Center for Early Learning and Children's Media at Saint Vincent College.

Caring for Children in Low-Income Families: A Substudy of the National Child Care Survey, 1990

Caring for Children in Low-Income Families is a study that NAEYC conducted with The Urban Institute in 1990 on affordable child care facilities for low- income families. This book explores multiple different aspects of the lives of low-income children and day care. The study also examines aspects of the family lives. For example, whether a home has a single parent, two parents, unemployed parents, or other odd family situations and how that affects the children and their abilities to receive proper education. This was a very thorough and detailed study conducted by NAEYC and it helped them to better suit their own child care facilities to adapt to the needs of low-income families.

== Presidents of the NAEYC Governing Board ==
| Name | Term |
|---|---|
| Evangeline H. Ward | 1970–1974 |
| D. Bruce Gardner | 1974–1976 |
| Bernard Spodek | 1976–1978 |
| Jan McCarthy | 1978–1980 |
| Barbara T. Bowman | 1980–1982 |
| Bettye M. Caldwell | 1982–1984 |
| Docia Zavitkovsky | 1984–1986 |
| David Elkind | 1986–1988 |
| Ellen Galinsky | 1988–1990 |
| Lana Hostetler | 1990–1992 |
| Lilian G. Katz | 1992–1994 |
| Jerlean Daniel | 1994–1996 |
| Richard M. Clifford | 1996–1998 |
| Sharon Lynn Kagan | 1998–1999 |
| Kathy R. Thornburg | 2000–2001 |
| Jane Wiechel | 2002–2004 |
| Dwayne Crompton | 2005 |
| Josue Cruz, Jr. | 2005–2006 |
| Anne Mitchell | 2006–2008 |
| Sue Russell | 2008–2010 |
| Stephanie Fanjul | 2010–2012 |
| Gera Jacobs | 2012-2014 |
| Deborah Cassidy (President Elect) | 2014-2016 (died in 2016) |
| Carol Brunson Day | 2014-2017 (retired in 2017) |
| Tammy L. Mann | 2017–2018 |
| Amy O'Leary | 2018-2020 |
| Ann McClain Terrell | 2020-2024 |
| Tonia Durden | 2024- |

== See also ==
- Preschool education
- National Council for Accreditation of Teacher Education (NCATE)
