= Ioannis Pavlidis =

Greek-American scholar

Ioannis Thomas Pavlidis
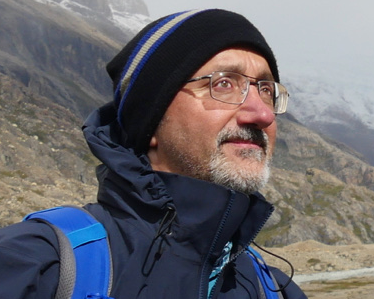
- Born: September 12, 1963 (age 63)
- Education: University of Minnesota Imperial College Democritus University
- Scientific career
- Workplaces: University of Houston
- Doctoral advisor: Nikolaos N. Papanikolopoulos
- Website: https://www.cpl.uh.edu

Ioannis Thomas Pavlidis (born September 12, 1963) is a Greek American scholar. He is the distinguished Eckhard-Pfeiffer Professor of Computer Science at the University of Houston, founder, and director of the Affective and Data Computing Laboratory, formerly known as the Computational Physiology Lab (CPL).

Poh at al. in their 2010 article in Optics Express credit Pavlidis as the "first who postulated the idea of performing physiological measurements on the face, which later demonstrated through analysis of facial thermal videos." Pavlidis went on to develop several contactless thermo-physiological measurement methods that found applications in emotion and wellness monitoring. Ioannou and colleagues in their 2014 review in Psychophysiology provide a detailed account of these new methods and Pavlidis' key role in their development. Pavlidis is also credited with the design of influential naturalistic studies in deceptive behaviors and driving distractions, which he conducted using the technical methods he developed earlier.

== Research ==
=== Contactless Physiological Measurements ===
In research between 2000 and 2012, Pavlidis developed contactless physiological measurements, impacting affective computing and personal health informatics. Affective computing has been relying on heart function, breathing function, and electrodermal activity (EDA) to estimate subjects' emotional arousal levels. Heart and breathing functions also happen to be vital signs used in health care. Conventionally, heart and breathing functions were measured with tethered body sensors, while EDA was measured with galvanic skin response (GSR) sensors attached to the palm. Such obtrusive measurement methods were rendering continuous physiological monitoring impractical and were undercutting the aim of affective computing to understand human emotions. For instance, EDA palm sensing precluded affective monitoring when the subjects' hands were at work, like in driving. To address these issues, Pavlidis designed contactless physiological measurement methods, which he operationalized by replacing sensors with thermal imaging trackers, and electronic devices with thermo-physiological models. His models were estimating heart (2001-2008), breath (2004-2010), and EDA signals (2009-2012) by operating on imagery of facial vasculature, the nostrils, and the perinasal region, respectively. The latter was also a significant discovery, as the existence of facial EDA responses was unknown up to that time.

Pavlidis first articulated his ideas for contactless, continuous, and automated physiological measurements in the paper `Continuous physiological monitoring', which appeared in the 2003 IEEE Engineering in Medicine and Biology Society (EMBS) conference proceedings. In 2004, Pavlidis and his colleagues reported imaging methods for contactless measurement of blood flow and breath in IEEE CVPR and IEEE EMBS, respectively. In the 2005 CVPR, Pavlidis and his colleagues followed up with an imaging method for contactless measurement of pulsation. The evolution of the contactless pulse and breath measurement methods culminated with Pavlidis' IEEE Transactions on Biomedical Engineering publications.

In 2009, Pavlidis reported progress on his third and final objective – a thermal imaging method to measure EDA responses on the face. Pavlidis placed emphasis on modeling and validating the phenomenon itself in his first paper on the matter. After he documented the existence of facial EDA, Pavlidis and his group published in 2012 a follow-up paper in the IEEE Transactions on Affective Computing, describing two computational methods to remotely measure facial EDA - one method was based on image morphology while the other was based on spatial isotropic wavelets.

Since then, contactless physiological monitoring has been finding an increasing number of applications in personal health informatics. For instance, during the COVID-19 pandemic, Boston Dynamics released the Dr. Spot canine robot, equipped with thermal and visual cameras for contact-free physiological measurements in clinical settings.

=== Naturalistic Behavioral Studies ===
Ioannis Pavlidis demonstrated that innovative affective computing methods must be employed within naturalistic research designs to deliver on their promise of understanding the human state. His studies approached humans as complex systems, unraveling the intricacies of the `fight or flight' syndrome in deceptive behaviors and driving distractions.

Studies on Deceptive Behaviors. In collaboration with Mark G. Frank, Pavlidis carried out naturalistic deception studies with unwired participants who chose freely to deceive interviewers, if they thought it would help an issue dear to them, but knowing if their deception failed, their issue would suffer. This was an unprogrammed, high stakes behavior, producing real-life `fight or flight' responses. Pavlidis and colleagues showed that pointed questions startle deceptive subjects, increasing their periorbital blood flow. This finding linked errant human communication with unnecessary ocular activation – a bio-evolutionary remnant of `fight or flight' responses in physical danger.

Pavlidis' `fight or flight' analysis of deception was one of the first breakthroughs attributable to the fledging affective computing field. His Nature article on the topic put the new affective computing methods on the map and deeply influenced research on deceptive behaviors. In the aftermath of his publications, the deception detection literature moved from obtrusive sensors and heuristics to unobtrusive sensors and computational algorithms. These futuristic methods of deception detection also entered popular culture. Pavlidis' system featured in episode 18 of the Discovery Channel's `Weird Connections' series, and inspired the interrogation technologies shown in the drama series `Agency' of CBS. Ioannis Pavlidis' initial collaboration with James A. Levine from Mayo Clinic and his subsequent research efforts to model deceptive behaviors have been chronicled by journalist Evan Ratliff and colleagues in their book SAFE.

Studies on Driving Distractions and Micro-stressors. Pavlidis, working together with the Texas A&M Transportation Institute, showed that both absent-minded driving and texting while driving generate `fight or flight' related hand-tremors. The difference, however, is that with eyes constantly on the road, the absent-minded drivers' anterior cingulate cortex can still manage driving subconsciously, by `hijacking' the hand-eye feedback loop and counterbalancing tremors; this is not possible for texting drivers, with eyes intermittently on the road. In the latter case, failure to counter-balance the effect of tremors leads to lane deviations. This finding established the unmitigated danger texting poses to driving safety and had broad impact to public perceptions and legal cases on the matter.

In more recent work, Pavlidis demonstrated that a portion of the driving population exhibits significant stress responses even in trivial acceleration events, such as stop-and-go traffic - a phenomenon he termed `accelarousal'. Accelarousal is likely associated with genetic predisposition and is now considered a prime example of daily micro-stressors, which many believe should factor into the design of self-driving cars.
