= Intelligence and How to Get It =

2009 book about education

- Author: Richard Nisbett
- Language: English
- Subject: Intelligence
- Publisher: W. W. Norton & Company
- Publication date: 2009
- Publication place: United States
- Media type: Print
- Pages: 304
- ISBN: 0393071413
- Preceded by: The Geography of Thought (2003)

Intelligence and How to Get It: Why Schools and Cultures Count is a 2009 book about human intelligence by Richard Nisbett, a professor of social psychology at the University of Michigan. The book challenges the hereditarians' argument that IQ is entirely or almost entirely heritable, and argues that nonhereditary factors play a more significant role than hereditarians assert. It also recommends how to tutor children so as to maximize their intelligence. The book also argues that IQ scores are a valid, though imperfect, indicator of general intelligence, while criticizing some of the assertions made about such scores in the 1994 book The Bell Curve. The book's appendix argues that racial differences in IQ are entirely due to environmental factors.

== Reviews ==
Writing for The New York Times, philosopher Jim Holt described the book as "a meticulous and eye-opening critique of hereditarianism." Psychologist Earl B. Hunt reviewed the book in the journal Intelligence, stating that "Nisbett is a very good writer, but he is a combative writer", and while "Nisbett is writing for a general audience" and "does so very well", Hunt argues that "Nisbett...goes too far in attacking discussions of the genetics of intelligence". In Gifted Child Quarterly, Wendy Johnson described the book as "a fascinating example of a scholarly exercise in wishful thinking", and criticized Nisbett for ignoring studies with results different from those that he cites, disregarding the importance of replication, and forgetting the limitations and caveats raised by the authors that he cites.
