= Josue Cruz Jr. =

American educator

Josué Cruz Jr. is an educator, professor, and current dean of the School Education at Bowling Green University. Cruz, a supporter of early childhood education, was appointed President of the National Association for the Education of Young Children in 2005.

| Preceded by Dwayne Crompton | President of the National Association for the Education of Young Children; 2005-2006 | Succeeded by Anne Mitchell |
