= Egocentrism =

Inability to differentiate between self and others

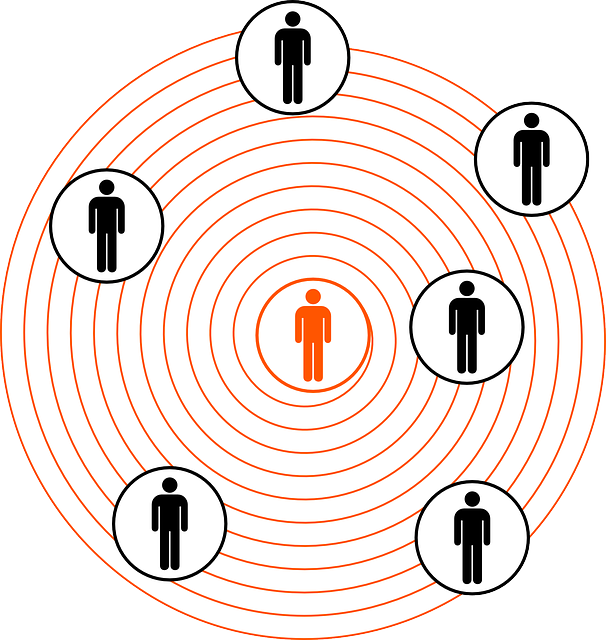
A diagram of egocentrism

Egocentrism is the tendency to view situations primarily from one’s own perspective and to have difficulty understanding or considering the perspectives of others. Egocentrism is found across the life span: in infancy, early childhood, adolescence, and adulthood. Although egocentric behaviors are less prominent in adulthood, the existence of some forms of egocentrism in adulthood indicates that overcoming egocentrism may be a lifelong development that never achieves completion. Adults appear to be less egocentric than children because they are faster to correct from an initially egocentric perspective than children, not because they are less likely to initially adopt an egocentric perspective.

== During infancy ==
When infants and young children display egocentrism they learn that their thoughts, values, and behaviors are different from those of others, also known as the theory of mind. Initially, during social interactions with others, mainly the caregivers, they misinterpret that they are one entity, because they are together for a long duration of time and the caregivers often provide for the children's needs. For example, a child may misattribute the act of their mother reaching to retrieve an object that they point to as a sign that they are the same entity, when in fact they are actually separate individuals.

As early as 15 months old, children show both egocentrism and theory of mind. In a 2005 study, the children observed the experimenter place a toy in one of two boxes. A screen blocked their view when the experimenter moved the toy into the other box. When the screen was removed, the children watched the experimenter's actions for much longer, and the children also looked longer when the experimenter reached for the original box, indicating surprise. Not only does this show the existence of infants' memory capacity, but it also demonstrates how they have expectations based on their knowledge, as they are surprised when those expectations are not met.

Piaget explained that egocentrism during infancy does not mean selfishness, self-centeredness, or egotism because it refers to the infant's understanding of the world in terms of their own motor activity as well as an inability to understand it. In children's social development, the infancy is the period where the individual performs very few social functions due to the conscious and subconscious concern with the fulfilment of physical needs.

== During childhood ==
According to George Butterworth and Margaret Harris, during childhood, one is usually unable to distinguish between what is subjective and objective.

Jean Piaget (1896–1980) developed a theory about the development of human intelligence, describing the stages of cognitive development. He claimed that early childhood is the time of pre-operational thought, characterized by children's inability to process logical thought. According to Piaget, one of the main obstacles to logic that children possess includes centration, "the tendency to focus on one aspect of a situation to the exclusion of others". A particular type of centration is egocentrism – literally, "self-centeredness". Piaget claimed that young children are egocentric, capable of contemplating the world only from their personal perspective. For example, a three-year-old presented his mother a model truck as her birthday present; "he had carefully wrapped the present and gave it to his mother with an expression that clearly showed he expected her to love it". The three-year-old boy had not chosen the present out of selfishness or greediness, but he simply failed to realize that, from his mother's perspective, she might not enjoy the model car as much as he would.

Piaget was concerned with two aspects of egocentricity in children: language and morality. He believed that egocentric children use language primarily for communication with oneself. Piaget observed that children would talk to themselves during play, and this egocentric speech was merely the child's thoughts. He believed that this speech had no special function; it was used as a way of accompanying and reinforcing the child's current activity. He theorized that as the child matures cognitively and socially the amount of egocentric speech used would be reduced. However, Vygotsky felt that egocentric speech has more meaning, as it allows the child's growth in social speech and high mental development. In addition to Piaget's theory, he believed that when communicating with others, the child believes that others know everything about the topic of discussion and become frustrated when asked to give further detail.

Piaget also believed that egocentrism affects the child's sense of morality. Due to egocentrism, the child is only concerned with the final outcome of an event rather than another's intentions. For example, if someone breaks the child's toy, the child would not forgive the other and the child would not be able to understand that the person who broke the toy did not intend to break it. This phenomenon can also be backed by the evidence from the findings of the case study by Nelson, who studied the use of motives and outcomes by young children as aiding to form their moral judgements.

Piaget did a test to investigate egocentrism called the mountains study. He put children in front of a simple plaster mountain range and then asked them to pick from four pictures the view that he, Piaget, would see. The younger children before age seven picked the picture of the view they themselves saw and were therefore found to lack the ability to appreciate a viewpoint different from their own. In other words, their way of reasoning was egocentric. Only when entering the concrete-operational stage of development at age seven to twelve, children became less egocentric and could appreciate viewpoints other than their own. In other words, they were capable of cognitive perspective-taking. However, the mountains test has been criticized for judging only the child's visuo-spatial awareness, rather than egocentrism. A follow-up study involving police dolls showed that even young children were able to correctly say what the interviewer would see. It is thought that Piaget overestimated the extent of egocentrism in children. Egocentrism is thus the child's inability to see other people's viewpoints, not to be confused with selfishness. The child at this stage of cognitive development assumes that their view of the world is the same as other people's.

In addition, a more well-known experiment by Wimmer and Perner (1983) called the false-belief task demonstrates how children show their acquisition of theory of mind (ToM) as early as 4 years old. In this task, children see a scenario where one character hides a marble in a basket, walks out of the scene, and another character that is present takes out the marble and puts it in a box. Knowing that the first character did not see the switching task, children were asked to predict where the first character would look to find the marble. The results show that children younger than 4 answer that the character would look inside the box, because they have the superior knowledge of where the marble actually is. It shows egocentric thinking in early childhood because they thought that even if the character itself did not see the entire scenario, it has the same amount of knowledge as they did, and therefore should look inside the box to find the marble. As children start to acquire ToM, their ability to recognize and process others' beliefs and values overrides the natural tendency to be egocentric.

== During adolescence ==
Although most of the research completed on the study of egocentrism is primarily focused on early childhood, it has been found to also occur during adolescence. David Elkind was one of the first to identify the presence of egocentrism in adolescence and late adolescence. He argues, "the young adolescent, because of the physiological metamorphosis he is undergoing, is primarily concerned with himself. Accordingly, since he fails to differentiate between what others are thinking about and his own mental preoccupations, he assumes that other people are as obsessed with his behavior and appearance as he is himself." The adolescent exhibits egocentrism by struggling to distinguish whether or not, others are as fond of them as they might think because their own thoughts are so prevalent. Adolescents consider themselves as "unique, special, and much more socially significant than they actually are."

Elkind also created terms for egocentric behaviors exhibited by adolescents, such as what he calls an imaginary audience, the personal fable and the invincibility fable. An egocentric adolescent experiencing an imaginary audience believes there is an audience captivated and constantly present to an extent of being overly interested about the egocentric individual. Personal fable refers to many teenagers' belief that their thoughts, feelings, and experiences are unique and more extreme than others'. In the invincibility fable, the adolescent believes that he or she is immune to misfortune and cannot be harmed by things that might defeat a normal person. Egocentrism in adolescence is often viewed as a negative aspect of their mental state because they become consumed with themselves and function more poorly in society due to their skewed version of reality and cynicism.

There are various reasons why adolescents experience egocentrism:

- Adolescents are often faced with new social environments (for example, starting secondary school) which require the adolescent to protect, and focus on, the self.
- Development of an adolescent's identity may involve perceiving high levels of uniqueness. This manifests as the personal fable.
- Parental rejection may lead to heightened levels of self-consciousness.

Gender differences have been found in the way egocentrism manifests. Transient Self, as defined by Elkind and Bowen in 1979, refers to an impermanent image of self that is mainly relative to one-time behaviors and temporary appearance. Adolescent females have a greater tendency to view themselves as different from others and tend to be more self-conscious in situations that involve momentary embarrassments (e.g. going to a party with a bad haircut), than their male peers. Another study conducted by Goossens and Beyers (1992) using similar measuring instruments found that boys have stronger beliefs that they are unique, invulnerable and sometimes omnipotent, which are typical characteristics of personal fable.

Throughout adolescence egocentrism contributes positively to the development of self-identity; in order to achieve self-identity, adolescents go through different pathways of "crisis" and "commitment" stages, and higher self-identity achievement was found to be correlated with heightened egocentrism.

== During adulthood ==
While decreased egocentrism is found between the ages of 15 and 16, adults also have reactions or behaviors that can be categorized as egocentric. Frankenberger tested adolescents (14–18 years old) and adults (20–89) on their levels of egocentrism and self-consciousness. It was found that egocentric tendencies extended into early adulthood and were still present in the middle adult years.

Baron and Hanna looked at 152 participants and tested to see how the presence of depression affected egocentrism. They tested adults between the ages of 18 and 25 and found that the participants who suffered from depression showed higher levels of egocentrism than those who did not.

Finally, Surtees and Apperly found that when adults were asked to judge the number of dots they see and the number of dots an avatar in the computer simulation would see, the presence of the avatar interfered with the participants' judgment-making during trials where the number of dots presented to the participant differed from the number of dots presented to the avatar. Such effect on the participants diminished when the avatar was replaced with a simple yellow or blue line, which suggested that participants projected their own vision onto the avatar with human traits. That said, they made more errors when they saw prompts such as "the avatar sees N" when N was the number of dots the participant saw and not the avatar, which shows that egocentric thought is still predominant in making quick judgments, even if the adults are well aware that their thoughts could differ from others.

== See also ==
- Allocentrism – an inexact antonym to "egocentrism," actually the opposite of "idiocentrism"
- Egoism
- Chauvinism
- Grandiosity
- Hubris
- Solipsism
