= Mark Frank =

Mark Frank may refer to:

- Mark Frank (athlete) (born 1977), javelin thrower from Germany
- Mark Frank (theologian) (1613–1664), English churchman and academic
- Mark G. Frank (born 1961), social psychologist and communication professor
