= Shai Davidai =

Israeli activist

- שי דוידאי
- Born: 1983 or 1984 (age 42–43); Ramat Gan, Israel
- Children: 2

Academic background
- Education: Hebrew University of Jerusalem (BA); Cornell University (MA, PhD)
- Doctoral advisor: Thomas Gilovich

Academic work
- Institutions: Princeton School of Public and International Affairs (2015-2016); The New School for Social Research (2016-2019); Columbia Business School (2019-2025)

Shai Davidai (born 1983 or 1984) is an Israeli activist and former assistant professor at Columbia Business School. He is known for his outspoken advocacy for Israel and against the Columbia University pro-Palestinian campus protests and occupations during the Gaza war. After the October 7 attacks on Israel and during the subsequent Gaza war, Davidai's pro-Israel activity led him into conflict with Columbia University students, faculty, and administrators. He was temporarily suspended from the university for alleged harassment of faculty. An investigation into his conduct ended without a conclusion, and he left Columbia in July 2025.

== Early life and family ==
Davidai is Jewish and was born in Ramat Gan, Israel. His parents still live in Israel. His grandfather, Benjamin, was vice president of El Al and assisted in capturing Adolf Eichmann. Davidai grew up in Kiryat Ono. Unwilling to do his military service in the Israeli-occupied West Bank, he signed up for the Israeli navy, where he served as a medic. He is married to Yardenne Greenspan, an Israeli writer, and has two children.

== Academic career ==
Davidai earned a B.A. in psychology and cognitive science from the Hebrew University of Jerusalem in 2009. After moving to the United States around 2009, he earned a Ph.D. in social psychology and personality psychology from Cornell University in 2015. Professor Thomas Gilovich was his Ph.D. advisor.

Davidai did a post-doctoral fellowship at the Princeton University School of Public and International Affairs in 2015–16. His first faculty position was at The New School for Social Research, where he was assistant professor of psychology from 2016 to 2019.

From 2019 to 2025, Davidai was an assistant professor in the Columbia Business School faculty. He has studied how individuals' views on inequality, success, and failure affect their well-being. His work has been published in the Proceedings of the National Academy of Sciences and numerous social and experimental psychology journals. His findings on FOMO, nepo babies, and perception of income inequality have been featured in The New York Times, Scientific American, The Guardian, and The New Yorker.

== Gaza war ==
=== Pro-Israel advocacy at Columbia University ===
After the October 7 attacks on Israel and subsequent Gaza war, protests erupted at numerous educational institutions, including Columbia University. In Davidai's view, the student protesters were motivated by "hate". Critical of Columbia's response to pro-Palestine activism and antisemitism on its campus, he called on the administration to discipline pro-Palestine student organizations and increase its support for Jewish students.

After a Students for Justice in Palestine (SJP) leader called the October 7 attacks "an unprecedented historic moment" and a faculty member referred to them as "a stunning victory", Davidai spoke at a candlelight vigil on campus in October 2023. In his speech, which he called an "open letter to every parent in America", he said that student protesters had celebrated the October 7 attacks and that several universities, including Columbia, were unsafe. Saying that KKK or ISIS supporters would not be allowed to demonstrate on campus, he called on university leadership to "eradicate all pro-terror student organizations".

Columbia students set up encampments on campus as part of a pro-Palestine protest in April 2024. Davidai criticized the university's response as insufficient and called for the National Guard to respond. On 22 April, he asked Columbia's administration for police protection for a pro-Israel protest he had planned near the student encampment. It declined and told him to hold his event away from the encampment. When Davidai attempted to enter the main Columbia campus later that day, an administrator denied him access, and he discovered that his ID card had been deactivated. In a speech to the group of protesters that had come with him, he said it was his right as a Jewish person and professor to access the campus. He later tweeted: "This is 1938", comparing the incident to laws banning Jewish professors in Nazi Germany. A month later, Davidai reported that he had regained access to the campus.

Later that year, a Jewish student said he was punched in the face at a Barnard pro-Palestinian protest, and Davidai argued that the university's inadequate response to campus protests had promoted the conditions leading to the violence. He also attributed the 2025 New Orleans truck attack to universities' inadequate response to protests organized by Students for Justice in Palestine (SJP).

In March 2025, Davidai posted a message to Secretary of State Marco Rubio on X calling for the deportation of Palestinian student protester Mahmoud Khalil. Khalil emailed Columbia interim president Katrina Armstrong asking for protection following a "doxxing campaign", naming Davidai as one of the campaign's two leaders. Khalil was detained by ICE the next day. Davidai supported the arrest but expressed concern that Khalil would not receive a fair trial.

Davidai appeared in October 8 (2025), a documentary about antisemitism during the Gaza war.

=== Investigation ===
In April 2024, Columbia President Minouche Shafik said that over 50 complaints had been lodged against Davidai and he was under investigation for harassment. A petition alleging that Davidai harassed pro-Palestinian students on social media and calling for his termination obtained over 11,000 signatures. Another petition urged Columbia to drop its investigation and was supported by more than 32,000 signatures. Davidai denied targeting any individual students and said he focused on student organizations that support terrorism. He added that he was receiving death threats and other harassment.

According to Columbia, Davidai was temporarily suspended from campus in October 2024 for harassing university employees. Columbia said Davidai threatened and intimidated the university's chief operating officer, Cas Holloway, in violation of university policies. Earlier that month, Davidai had published a video of himself following and questioning Halloway about the university's response to pro-Palestine protests on campus. Davidai had also doxxed a Columbia professor on his Twitter account and called Columbia professor Rashid Khalidi a Hamas spokesperson. In response to the suspension, Davidai said he was being unfairly targeted for his pro-Israel activism. Over 400 people affiliated with Columbia signed a letter to interim university president Katrina Armstrong calling Davidai's suspension "egregious".

In July 2025, Davidai posted a screenshot on social media of a letter from the Columbia University "Office of Institutional Equity" saying that its investigation into him for harassment was closed without a determination of wrongdoing. Along with the screenshot, Davidai wrote that Columbia had "admitted that I hadn't done anything wrong". The same day, Columbia Business School announced to faculty that Davidai was leaving. One of his accusers posted a screenshot of a different letter from OIE that said it had ended the investigation without any determination and that investigations close when their subjects' employment ends. According to Davidai, he resigned voluntarily because he no longer believes in the school or the faculty. Davidai has pledged to continue his pro-Israel advocacy, including writing a book about Columbia University and working on his podcast Here I Am With Shai Davidai.

== Political views ==
Davidai opposes Israeli Prime Minister Benjamin Netanyahu and supports a two-state solution. He participated in the 2023 Israeli judicial reform protests in Tel Aviv, during which he was punched in the face. Thomas Gilovich, Davidai's PhD advisor, has called him a "peacenik". He considers himself pro-Israel, pro-Palestinian, anti-terror, and a liberal leftist. Davidai interprets "from the river to the sea" and "globalize the intifada" as calls for violence against Israelis and Jews.

Tablet published a 2024 article by Davidai and his wife. They wrote that they had lost friends due to their pro-Israel activism, despite their left-wing Israeli politics, including avoiding the purchase of items from the Israeli-occupied West Bank. The article was criticized by Betar US, which interpreted it as Davidai supporting boycotting Israel. Davidai has criticized Betar, at one point calling it "a group of violence-loving thugs".

== See also ==
- Antisemitism at Columbia University
- Antisemitism and higher education in the United States
- Criticism of Israel
