= Anne Mitchell =

American educator (born 1950)

Anne Walsh Mitchell (born May 26, 1950) is an American educator. She is a consultant in the early childhood education field and President of Early Childhood Policy Research in Climax, New York, and is the immediate past president of the Board of the National Association for the Education of Young Children. She is also the co-founder, with Louise Stoney, of the Alliance on Early Childhood Finance.

== Personal life ==
Mitchell was born in Hingham, Massachusetts, to Kate Margaret Walsh Mitchell and Robert Buck Mitchell. She has been married since October 22, 1982, and is the mother of one daughter.

== Educational background ==
Mitchell graduated from Wellesley College in 1972 with a Bachelor of Science degree in astronomy and received her Master of Arts degree in Early Childhood Education Leadership from the Bank Street College of Education in 1988. She is also the recipient of a Certificate in Early Childhood Leadership Development (1995) from the University of North Carolina at Chapel Hill.

== Career ==
Mitchell began her professional career as a teacher-director of a child care center in a low-income house development in Cambridge, Massachusetts.

In the early 1980s, Mitchell began working for the Bank Street College of Education, eventually becoming the Associate Dean of the Research Division, a post she held through 1991.

Mitchell's work has included national studies of state and local prekindergarten policy and early care and education finance. She has also written widely on child care and early education policy and practice.

Mitchell is serving her fifth 3-year term as an elected member of the Greenville (New York) Board of Education, has served as its president and is now vice president. She completed five years on the State Professional Standards and Practices Board for Teaching appointed by the New York State Board of Regents, and is a Past-President of the National Association for the Education of Young Children. In 2003, Mitchell received the Champion for Children award from the New York State Association for the Education of Young Children. In 2005, Mitchell received the Bank Street College Alumni Association Recognition Award and the Early Childhood Achievement Award from Scholastic, Inc. In 2007, she received the Visionary Award from the National Louis University’s McCormick Tribune Center for Early Childhood Leadership. Mitchell received the 2008 Excellence in Leadership award from the New York State Child Care Coordinating Council. In 2009, Mitchell received the President’s Award from the National Association for Family Child Care.

Mitchell is currently the president of Early Childhood Policy Research, an independent consulting firm specializing in evaluation research, policy analysis and planning on child care/early education issues for government, foundations and national nonprofit organizations.

== Publications ==
- "Early Childhood Programs and the Public Schools: between Promise and Practice" (1989)
- "A Proposal for Licensing Individuals who practice Early Care and Education" (1995)
- the 1997 and 2001 editions of "Financing Child Care in the United States"
- "Education for all Young Children: the role of states and the Federal Government in promoting Prekindergarten and Kindergarten" (2001)
- "The State with Two Prekindergarten Programs: a look at Prekindergarten Education in New York State 1928-2003" (2004)
- "The Price of School Readiness: a tool for estimating the cost of Universal Preschool in the States"(2004)
- "Success Stories: State Investment in Early Care and Education in Illinois, North Carolina and Rhode Island"
- "Stair Steps to Quality: A Guide for State and Communities Developing Quality Rating Systems for Early Care and Education" (2005)
- "Smarter Reform: Moving Beyond Single-Program Solutions to an Early Care and Education System" (2006)
- "Using Tax Credits to Promote High Quality Early Care and Education Services" (2007)
