= Equality Illinois =

American LGBTQ advocacy group

- Equality Illinois logo

- US State of Illinois
- Founded: 1991
- Location: Chicago, Illinois, United States
- Key people: Channyn Lynne Parker, Interim Chief executive officer
- Website: equalityillinois.org

Equality Illinois (EI) is an LGBTQ advocacy organization founded in 1991 that focuses on education and legal protection for the LGBTQ community in Illinois.

== Structure ==
The Equality Illinois Institute focuses on the educational and charitable aspects of the mission. EI's initiatives extend throughout every sector of Illinois life, reaching individuals and organizations both in the LGBTQ community and society at large, across the private, public and non-profit sectors.

The Equality Illinois Political Action Committee (PAC) promotes candidates for public office who will advocate for and support legislation that advances full equality for LGBTQ individuals and families.

The organization is a member of the Equality Federation.

== EQIL's Work ==
- Equality Illinois works with legislators in Washington, D.C., and in Springfield, as well as leaders at the local level to ensure that the LGBTQ community has a voice at the table when major decisions are made. Equality Illinois is a 501(c)(4) organization and has educational and political action affiliate organizations.
- The Equality Illinois Institute, a 501(c)(3) educational organization affiliated with Equality Illinois, focuses on the educational and charitable aspects of EI's mission. Through the Equality Illinois Institute, Equality Illinois continues to educate the public about the need to secure the rights of all Illinois citizens, couples, and families. EI's work reaches individuals and organizations both in the LGBTQ community and the general public across the private, public, and nonprofit sectors.
- Equality Illinois PAC, a non-partisan state political action committee affiliated with Equality Illinois, supports candidates for state and local office in Illinois. Equality Illinois PAC supports candidates for state, county, and local office who believe that every citizen has a basic right to equal treatment under the law regardless of sexual orientation or gender identity.

=== Equality Illinois Publications and Reports ===
- Marriage Rights in Illinois
- Equality Illinois DOMA FAQs
- Civil Union Report: Separate Not Proven to be Equal
- Name and Gender Marker Changes Tool Kit
- Raising the Bar 2016
- The Law Firm Best Practices Manual
- Equality Illinois 2015 Marriage Planning Guide
- The Rauner Administration at Six Months
- Season of Inclusion 2015 Brochure
- Corporate Best Practices: A Guide to LGBTQ-Inclusive Workplaces in Illinois
- Growing Your Family: A Guide for Prospective LGBTQ Parents
- Tax Implications of Marriage Equality
- LGBTQ Supportive Religious Officiant List 2014

=== Equality Illinois "Know Your Rights" Pamphlets ===
- Safe Schools
- Transgender Issues
- Employment
- Immigration
- Marriage Recognition at the Federal Level
- Health Services
- Housing

== History and Past Achievements ==
Equality Illinois was formerly called the Illinois Federation for Human Rights, and Lana Hostetler cofounded it.

Equality Illinois is an LGBTQ civil rights organization based in the Midwest. Among its accomplishments are:

=== Religious Freedom and Marriage Fairness Act ===
- Promoted, lobbied for and won passage of the Religious Freedom and Marriage Fairness Act in 2013, which gave same-sex couples in Illinois the right to marry.

=== Illinois Religious Freedom Protection and Civil Union Act ===
- Promoted, lobbied for and won passage of the Illinois Religious Freedom Protection and Civil Union Act (civil union law) in 2010, which promises the same benefits, obligations and responsibilities of marriage (under state law). The major benefits include hospital visitation, healthcare decision making, inheritance and probate rights;

=== Youth Mental Health Protection Act ===
- Promoted, lobbied for and won passage of the Youth Mental Health Protection Act (conversion therapy ban) in 2015, banning the harmful practice of conversion therapy to be used on minors in the state of Illinois. The practice of gay conversion therapy was harshly criticized by Illinois mental health experts in March 2015 when a group of experts released a letter saying efforts to force LGBTQ youth to change are harmful and ineffective and urged state action to stop it.

=== Safe Schools Act ===
- Worked in coalition with partner groups to advance and pass the Safe Schools Act, which was signed into law in June 2010;

=== Human Rights Act ===
- Promoted, lobbied for and won passage of amendments to the Human Rights Act in 2005, prohibiting discrimination based upon sexual orientation and gender identity;

=== Vote Naked Illinois ===
- Developed a "Get Out the Vote" campaign, Vote Naked Illinois, which led to over 75,000 mail-in votes in Cook County and Chicago during the 2010 election.
- Registered thousands of new Illinois voters, and developed a strong network of over 17,000 human rights supporters throughout Illinois and beyond;
- Educated and informed citizens of Illinois and members of the General Assembly, and worked to raise awareness of issues confronting LGBTQ individuals in the community and workplace;

=== Fair Illinois ===
- Equality Illinois also joined with three other organizations to launch the Fair Illinois initiative dedicated to opposing an anti-gay marriage advisory referendum proposed for the November 2006 ballot. The initiative reviewed over 345,000 petition signatures. The advisory referendum was removed from the ballot in September 2006.

=== Other Accomplishments ===
- Expanded statewide grassroots support for LGBTQ issues and initiatives, individually, as well as in partnership with religious institutions and other community organizations;
- Targeted information and services to populations that have been disenfranchised, such as women, minorities and youth;
- Assisted businesses in development of welcoming and inclusive workplace policies;
- Conducted polls and surveys of public attitudes on civil rights issues;
- Worked to educate the media and encourage public discussion about these issues.

== Illinois Unites for Marriage Coalition ==
In 2012–2013, Equality Illinois played a significant role advocating for same-sex marriage in Illinois. The organization partnered with Lambda Legal and ACLU of Illinois to create the Illinois Unites for Marriage coalition to push for the bill. The same-sex marriage bill passed the legislature in 2013 and was signed into law by Gov. Pat Quinn on November 20, 2013.

== Annual Gala ==
The Equality Illinois Gala is an annual event. The 2019 event was attended by approximately 1,400 guests, including several public officials.

== Freedom Award ==
The Equality Illinois Freedom Award is given annually at the Equality Illinois gala to celebrate exemplary allies of the Illinois LGBTQ community. House Democratic Leader Nancy Pelosi will accept the recognition at the Equality Illinois 25th Anniversary Gala on February 6, 2016. Past Freedom Award winners include Illinois Senate President John Cullerton, state Rep. Greg Harris, the late state Comptroller Dawn Clark Netsch, the late state Rep. Mark Beaubien Jr., state Sen. Heather Steans, U.S. Sen. Mark Kirk, the Chicago Urban League, entertainer Lea DeLaria, the TransLife Center of Chicago House and filmmaker Lana Wachowski.

== Honors ==
In 2005 Equality Illinois was inducted into the Chicago Gay and Lesbian Hall of Fame.

== 2016 Logo ==
Equality Illinois' new logo was unveiled on January 14, 2016. On January 14, 2016, Equality Illinois introduced a new logo and the slogan "Until we're all equal".

== See also ==
- LGBT rights in Illinois
- LGBT history in Illinois
- Same-sex marriage in Illinois
- List of LGBT rights organizations
