= Lana Hostetler =

American educator and activist (1941–1999)

- Born: 1941
- Died: February 4, 1999 (aged 57–58); Springfield, Illinois, U.S.
- Occupations: educator; activist

Lana Hostetler (died February 4, 1999) was an educator and activist.

== Life ==
Hostetler was an activist in the 1960s for civil rights and an activist in the 1970s for women's rights. Beginning in 1970, she was also an early childhood education professor at Lincoln Land Community College.

In the early 1980s she served as President of the Illinois Association for the Education of Young Children. She later served as president of the National Association for the Education of Young Children.

Beginning in 1992, she was a lobbyist for the gay rights group Illinois Federation for Human Rights, which she co-founded. The organization is now called Equality Illinois.

== Death ==
Hostetler died at the age of 57, on February 4, 1999, in Memorial Medical Center. There was a fire at her home and she died of smoke inhalation.

== Legacy ==
She was inducted into the Chicago LGBT Hall of Fame in 2021.
