= Elkind =

Elkind is a surname. Notable people with the surname include:

- David Elkind (born 1931), American psychologist and author
- Edith Elkind, Estonian computer scientist
- Jerome I. Elkind, American electrical engineer and computer scientist

== See also ==
- Elkins (surname)
