= Richard E. Nisbett =

American psychologist (born 1941)

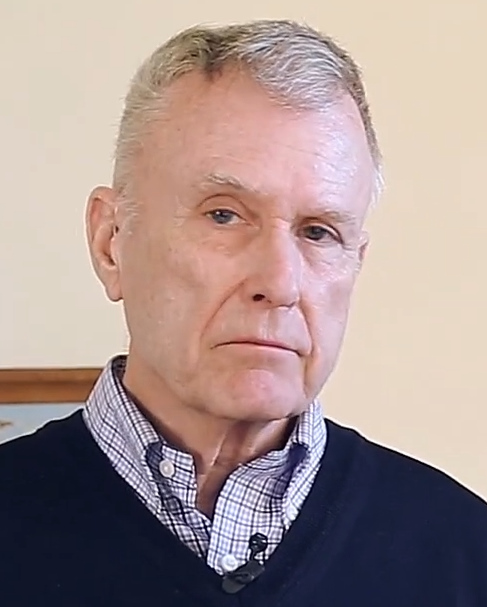
- Nisbett in 2014
- Born: June 1, 1941 (age 85); Littlefield, Texas, U.S.
- Education: Tufts University ( A.B.); Columbia University (PhD}
- Spouse: Sarah Isaacs
- Children: 2
- Awards: Donald T. Campbell Award from American Psychological Association (1982), Guggenheim Fellowship (2002)
- Scientific career
- Fields: Social psychology
- Institutions: University of Michigan
- Thesis: Taste, deprivation and weight determinants of eating behavior (1966)
- Doctoral advisor: Stanley Schachter

Richard Eugene Nisbett (born June 1, 1941) is an American social psychologist and writer. He is the Theodore M. Newcomb Distinguished Professor of social psychology and co-director of the Culture and Cognition program at the University of Michigan at Ann Arbor. Nisbett's research interests are in social cognition, culture, social class, and aging. He received his Ph.D. from Columbia University, where his advisor was Stanley Schachter, whose other students at that time included Lee Ross and Judith Rodin.

== Education ==
Nisbett received an A.B. from Tufts University in Psychology in 1962 and his PhD from Columbia University, in 1966 in Social Psychology.

== Research ==
Perhaps his most influential publication is "Telling more than we can know: Verbal reports on mental processes" (with T. D. Wilson, 1977, Psychological Review, 84, 231–259), one of the most often cited psychology articles published, with over 13,000 citations. This article was the first comprehensive, empirically based argument that a variety of mental processes responsible for preferences, choices, and emotions are inaccessible to conscious awareness. Nisbett and Wilson contended that introspective reports can provide only an account of "what people think about how they think," but not "how they really think." Some cognitive psychologists disputed this claim, with Ericsson and Simon (1980) offering an alternative perspective.

Nisbett's book The Geography of Thought: How Asians and Westerners Think Differently... And Why (Free Press; 2003) contends that "human cognition is not everywhere the same," that Asians and Westerners "have maintained very different systems of thought for thousands of years," and that these differences are scientifically measurable. Nisbett's book Intelligence and How to Get It: Why Schools and Cultures Count (2009) argues that environmental factors dominate genetic factors in determining intelligence. The book received extensive favorable attention in the press and from some fellow academics; for example, University of Pennsylvania psychologist Daniel Osherson wrote that the book was a "hugely important analysis of the determinants of IQ". On the other hand, more critical reviewers such as Harvard's James J. Lee argued that the book failed to grapple with the strongest evidence for genetic factors in individual and group intelligence differences. Nisbett was a co-author of the influential text Social Psychology (with Serena Chen, Thomas Gilovich, and Dacher Keltner)

With Edward E. Jones, he named the actor–observer bias, the phenomenon where people acting and people observing use different explanations for why a behavior occurs. This is an important concept in attribution theory, and refers to the tendency to attribute one's own behaviour to situational factors while attributing other people's behaviour to their disposition. Jones and Nisbett's own explanation for this was that our attention is focused on the situation when we are actors, but on the person when we are observers, although other explanations have been advanced for the actor-observer bias.

== In popular culture ==
In an interview with The New York Times, Canadian journalist Malcolm Gladwell said, "The most influential thinker, in my life, has been the psychologist Richard Nisbett. He basically gave me my view of the world."

== Works ==
- Nisbett, R. and T. Wilson (1977). "Telling more than we can know: Verbal reports on mental processes." Psychological Review 84(3): 231–259.
- Ross, L and Nisbett, R.E. The Person and the Situation. McGraw Hill, 1991. Reissued with new foreword by Malcolm Gladwell and afterword by the authors, 2011
- Culture of Honor: The Psychology of Violence in the South (Westview Press, 1996)
- The Geography of Thought (Free Press, 2003) ISBN 978-0743216463
- Intelligence and How to Get It: Why Schools and Cultures Count (Norton, 2009)
- Mindware: Tools for Smart Thinking (FSG, 2015)

== Awards ==
- Donald T. Campbell Award for Distinguished Research in Social Psychology, awarded by the Society for Personality and Social Psychology, 1982.
- Award for Distinguished Scientific Contributions to Psychology, American Psychological Association, 1991.
- Fellow, American Academy of Arts and Sciences, 1992.
- Distinguished Senior Scientist Award, Society for Experimental Social Psychology, 1995
- Wei Lun Visiting professor of psychology, Chinese University of Hong Kong, 1995.
- William James Fellow Award for Distinguished Scientific Achievements, American Psychological Society, 1996.
- Elected to the National Academy of Sciences, 2002
- Oswald-Külpe-Award of the University of Würzburg, Germany, 2007
