= Dwayne Crompton =

American academic (1946–2022)

Dwayne Crompton (September 26, 1946 – May 29, 2022) was an early childhood professional and the (first African-American male) president of the National Association for the Education of Young Children (NAEYC).

Elected in 2003, he asked the organization for a one-year delay (due to a seemingly minor illness) in the beginning of his term (which was set to start in 2004). Upon taking office in 2005, he resigned a few months later due to illness stemming from the need for a heart transplant. Crompton died on May 29, 2022, at the age of 75.

== Sources ==
- Crompton's testimony to Subcommittee on Education Reform
- Article on Compton's supposedly excessive composation as head of a Head Start program
- http://archives.republicans.edlabor.house.gov/archive/hearings/108th/edr/headstart030603/crompton.htm
- http://www.spoke.com/people/dwayne-crompton-3e1429c09e597c1003740474
- https://web.archive.org/web/20130917223239/http://naeyc.org/newsroom/pressreleases/archive2005/20050511 (Cruz appointed to succeed Dwayne Crompton)
- http://www.lincolnu.edu/web/national-alumni-association/hall-of-fame
- https://web.archive.org/web/20131203184727/http://www.lincolnu.edu/c/document_library/get_file?uuid=e811d946-0e2f-4f67-a915-a806b1a3edf8&groupId=141695
- http://www.worldmag.com/2003/12/education
- http://www.semissourian.com/story/123163.html
- https://web.archive.org/web/20120126135813/http://voices.kansascity.com/entries/more-head-start/
- http://www2.ljworld.com/news/2003/dec/27/kc_head_start/
- http://archives.republicans.edlabor.house.gov/archive/press/press108/10oct/headstart102003.htm
- http://www.childcareexchange.com/library/5010736.pdf
- http://www.walkersresearch.com/profilePages/Show_Executive_Title/Executiveprofile/D/Dwayne__Crompton_100002950.html
- http://www.bizjournals.com/kansascity/stories/2004/02/09/daily37.html

Preceded by Jane Wiechel	President of the National Association for the Education of Young Children; 2005	Succeeded by Josue Cruz Jr.
