= Serena Chen =

American social psychologist

- Born: New York City, U.S.

Academic background
- Education: New York University; Cornell University

Academic work
- Discipline: Social psychology
- Website: Official website

Serena Chen (b. July 16, 1970) is an American social psychologist known for her work on the self and interpersonal relationships. She is Professor of Psychology at the University of California, Berkeley, and currently serves as Chair of the Psychology Department. Her research utilizes a social-cognition framework, and has been featured in The New York Times, The Wall Street Journal, and other news outlets.

== Education ==
Chen completed her undergraduate degree in psychology at Cornell University, where she graduated magna cum laude. At Cornell, Chen worked under the supervision of Thomas Gilovich on the topic of cognitive dissonance.

Chen continued her education at New York University (NYU), completing her PhD in Social Psychology in 1997. Her dissertation, titled Making sense of significant others: "Theories" about significant others and their role in transference, was supervised by Susan M. Andersen. As a graduate student, Chen collaborated with Shelly Chaiken, Alice Eagly, and John Bargh. Although Chen's education at NYU largely focused on social cognition, she was more interested in studying the self and relationships.

== Research and career ==
One of Chen's main research areas is focused on the self. She has written numerous articles and publications that focus on concepts of self and how an individual perceives themselves in terms of close relationships and intergroup relations. She also utilizes a social-cognition approach towards these concepts due to her background.

Chen first worked at University of Michigan in Ann Arbor, Michigan. In January 2001, she became a Professor of Psychology at University of California, Berkeley, where she is currently the Marian E. and Daniel E. Koshland, Jr. Distinguished Chair for Innovative Teaching and Research. Chen is also the Chair of the Psychology Department. In this department, she also runs the 'Self, Identity, and Relationships' (SIR) laboratory, which conducts ongoing research. Chen's research on identity formation was utilized by TJ Maxx in 2018 to create the Maxx You Project, which hosts workshops that focus on empowering women and celebrating their differences. She has also co-authored a social psychology text book, Social Psychology, with Thomas Gilovich, Dacher Keltner, and Richard E. Nisbett.

== Honors and awards ==
In 2006, Chen won the Early Career Award from the International Society for Self and Identity, which is an award given to an individual who has made advancements in the field within 10 years of obtaining their PhD. In 2007, she was named as a ‘Rising Star’ by the Association for Psychological Science. She also won the Distinguished Teaching Award from the Social Sciences Division of the University of California, Berkeley, in 2010.
