= Illusion of transparency =

Psychological trait

The illusion of transparency is a tendency for people to overestimate the degree to which their personal mental state is known by others. Another manifestation of the illusion of transparency (sometimes called the observer's illusion of transparency) is a tendency for people to overestimate how well they understand others' personal mental states. This cognitive bias is similar to the illusion of asymmetric insight.

== Experimental support ==
For her PhD dissertation in psychology at Stanford University, Elizabeth Newton created a simple test that she regarded as an illustration of the phenomenon. She would tap out a well-known song, such as "Happy Birthday to You" or "The Star-Spangled Banner", with her finger and have the test subject guess the song. People usually estimate that the song will be guessed correctly in about 50 percent of the tests, but only 3 percent pick the correct song. The tapper can hear every note and the lyrics in his or her head; however, the observer, with no access to what the tapper is thinking, only hears a rhythmic tapping.

== Public speaking and stage fright ==
The illusion of transparency is commonly prominent in public speakers. It may be increased by the spotlight effect. The speaker has an exaggerated sense of how obvious his or her nervousness about a speech is to the audience. Studies have shown that when the audience is surveyed, the speaker's emotions were not nearly so evident to the crowd as the speaker perceived them to be. Initial anxiety in a public speaking situation can cause stress that, because of the illusion of transparency, the speaker may feel is evident to the listeners. This mistaken perception can cause the speaker to compensate, which he or she then feels is even more obvious to the crowd, and the stress increases in a feedback loop. Awareness of the limits of others' perceptions of one's mental state can help break the cycle and reduce speech anxiety.

=== Studies on public speaking and the illusion of transparency ===
Kenneth Savitsky and Thomas Gilovich performed two experiments on public speaking anxiety in relation to the illusion of transparency. The first focused on the speaker's perception of their anxiety levels versus an observer's perception of the speaker's anxiety levels. The results were as expected: the speaker judged themself more harshly than the observer did.

In their second study, Savitsky and Gilovich focused on the connection between the illusion of transparency and the exacerbation of speech anxiety. Participants in this study were divided into three groups: control, reassured, and informed. All were given a topic and had five minutes to prepare a speech in front of a crowd, after which they rated themselves on anxiety, speech quality, and appearance, and observers also rated them on anxiety levels and speech quality. The control group were given no other advance instructions. The reassured and informed groups were both told in advance that it is normal to feel anxiety about giving a speech. The reassured group were told that research indicates they should not worry about this. The informed group were told about the illusion of transparency and that research indicates that emotions are usually not as evident to others as people believe they are. The informed group rated themselves higher in every respect and were also rated higher by the observers. The informed group, understanding that the audience would not be able to perceive their nervousness, had less stress and their speech tended to be better.

== The bystander effect ==
Thomas Gilovich, Kenneth Savitsky, and Victoria Husted Medvec believe that this phenomenon is partially the reason for the bystander effect. They found that concern or alarm were not as apparent to observers as the individual experiencing them thought, and that people believed they would be able to read others' expressions better than they actually could.

When confronted with a potential emergency, people typically play it cool, adopt a look of nonchalance, and monitor the reactions of others to determine if a crisis is really at hand. No one wants to overreact, after all, if it might not be a true emergency. However, because each individual holds back, looks nonchalant, and monitors the reactions of others, sometimes everyone concludes (perhaps erroneously) that the situation is not an emergency and hence does not require intervention.

— Thomas Gilovich, Kenneth Savitsky, and Victoria Husted Medvec, Journal of Personal and Social Psychology, Vol. 75, No. 2

== See also ==
- List of cognitive biases
- Poe's law
- Thought broadcasting - the unhealthy belief that others have access to one's thought
- Introspection illusion - the tendency for people to overestimate how much they know their own thought process
