= Illusion of asymmetric insight =

Psychological trait

The illusion of asymmetric insight is a cognitive bias whereby people perceive their knowledge of others to surpass other people's knowledge of them. This bias "has been traced to people's tendency to view their own spontaneous or off-the-cuff responses to others' questions as relatively unrevealing even though they view others' similar responses as meaningful".

== Study ==
A study finds that people seem to believe that they know themselves better than their peers know themselves and that their social group knows and understands other social groups better than other social groups know them. For example: Person A knows Person A better than Person B knows Person B or Person A. This bias may be sustained by a few cognitive beliefs, including:

- The personal conviction that observed behaviors are more revealing of other people than of the self, while private thoughts and feelings are more revealing of the self.
- The more an individual perceives negative traits ascribed to someone else, the more doubt individuals express about this person's self-knowledge. But, this doubt does not exist for our own self-knowledge. (For example: if Person A believes Person B has some great character flaw, Person A will distrust Person B's self-knowledge, while sustaining that they do not hold that same flaw in self-knowledge.)

A group of studies, performed by Pronin, Kruger, Savitsky, & Ross (2001), points to several different manifestations of the illusion of asymmetric insight:

- Study 1: Close friends' assessments of interpersonal knowledge: We know our close friends better than they know us. We understand them better, too.
- Study 2: Roommates' assessments of interpersonal and intrapersonal knowledge: We believe we know our roommates better than they know us. We know ourselves better than our roommates know themselves. And, we think the discrepancy between our self-knowledge and our roommate's knowledge of us is bigger than the discrepancy between how well we know our roommates and how well they know themselves.
- Study 3: Beliefs about the observability of one's own versus others' "true self": We believe we are less knowable than our friends—i.e., it is easier to get to know our friends than it is to get to know us.
- Study 4: Assessments of interpersonal knowledge after face-to-face interactions: In interpersonal interactions, we believe we find out more about other people than other people find out about us.
- Study 5: Perceived diagnosticity of our own versus others' responses to a projective test: Projective tests are better able to be diagnostic about other people, but not about ourselves.

== See also ==
- Illusion of transparency
- Fundamental attribution error
- List of cognitive biases
- Naïve realism (psychology)
