= The Geography of Thought =

2003 book by Richard E. Nisbett

- First US edition
- Author: Richard E. Nisbett
- Language: English
- Genre: Non-fiction
- Publisher: Free Press
- Publication date: 2003
- Publication place: United States
- Pages: 263
- ISBN: 0743216466

The Geography of Thought: How Asians and Westerners Think Differently...and Why is a book by social psychologist Richard E. Nisbett that was published by Free Press in 2003. By analyzing the differences between Asia and the West, it argues that cultural differences affect people's thought processes more significantly than believed.

In the book, Nisbett demonstrates that "people actually think about—and even see—the world differently because of differing ecologies, social structures, philosophies, and educational systems that date back to ancient Greece and China". At its core, the book assumes that human behavior is not “hard-wired” but a function of culture.

== Implications ==
There are several implications to Nisbett's theory. For instance, in law, Eastern and Western cultures assign different priorities and roles to the law in society. The ratio of lawyers to engineers is forty times higher in the US than in Japan. Moreover, the role of US lawyers is, generally, to handle legal confrontations, and the aim is demands for justice with a clear winner and loser based upon principles of justice that apply equally to everyone. In contrast, Asian lawyers are more often used as intermediaries to reduce hostilities, and reach a compromise; the principles they operate by are more flexible and circumstantial.

Another aspect where there is great divergence between these two systems of thought concerns human rights. In the West, there is more or less a single view of the relationship between individuals and states: individuals are understood to be separate units who enter into a social contract with one another which gives them certain rights and protections. East Asians, as well as most people outside the West, however, 'view societies not as aggregates of individuals but as molecules, or organisms. As a consequence, there is little or no conception of rights that inhere in the individual,' and in particular, '[f]or the Chinese, any conception of rights is based on a part-whole as opposed to a one-many conception of society' (ibid, 198). Therefore, the adoption of Western conceptions outside the West requires 'not just a different moral code, but a different conception of the nature of the individual' (ibid, 199).

There are also fundamentally different conceptions of religion in the East and West. In the East, there is a "both/and" mentality more so than the "right/wrong" one that predominates in the West. As a result, Eastern religion tends to be more tolerant and accommodating towards a plurality of religious beliefs and ideas. For example, in Japan and Korea one can identify as Buddhist, Confucian and Christian. As a result, religious wars have been historically rare. In the West, the Abrahamic religions (Judaism, Christianity and Islam) are monotheistic and usually exclusive of other belief systems. As a result, religious conflicts have been historically commonplace. Furthermore, the role of cycles and recurrences has had a large impact on Eastern religions, but less so in Western religions. This is evident in the fact that sin can be atoned for in Eastern religion, and to a degree in Christianity, but it is ineradicable in Protestantism (ibid, 199–200).

== Reception ==
Cultural anthropologist Sherry Ortner wrote a critical review in The New York Times, pointing out its methodological flaws (most of the experimental subjects are college students, leading to sample bias) as well as interpretational ones ("How much difference does there have to be between the Asians and the Westerners in a particular experiment to demonstrate a cultural divide?"). She was most critical about his "relentless attempt to cram everything into the Asian/Western dichotomy...into these monolithic units of East and West" without really addressing "differences within the categories" such as gender, religion, ethnicity, which are "occasionally acknowledged, but generally set aside".

Other reviews were more comfortable with Nisbett's generalities and word usage. He notes that "East Asians" indicate Chinese, Japanese, and Koreans, while "Westerners" typically means "America, but can be extended to the rest of the Anglosphere, and occasionally also to Europe". Robert Sternberg, president of the American Psychological Association, called it a "landmark book".

== See also ==
- Cultural psychology
- Nature versus nurture
- Civilization
- Clash of Civilizations
- East vs West
