= Personal fable =

Psychological concept

According to Alberts, Elkind, and Ginsberg the personal fable "is the corollary to the imaginary audience. Thinking of themselves as the center of attention, the adolescent comes to believe that it is because they are special and unique". It is found during the formal operational stage in Piagetian theory, along with the imaginary audience. Feelings of invulnerability are also common. The term "personal fable" was first coined by the psychologist David Elkind in his 1967 work Egocentrism in Adolescence.

Feelings of uniqueness may stem from fascination with one's own thoughts to the point where an adolescent believes that their thoughts or experiences are completely novel and unique when compared to the thoughts or experiences of others. This belief stems from the adolescent's inability to differentiate between the concern(s) of their thoughts from the thoughts of others, while simultaneously over-differentiating their feelings. Thus, an adolescent is likely to think that everyone else (the imaginary audience) is just as concerned with them as they are; while at the same time, this adolescent might believe that they are the only person who can possibly experience whatever feelings they might be experiencing at that particular time and that these experiences are unique to them. According to David Elkind (1967), an adolescent's intense focus on oneself as the center of attention is what ultimately gives rise to the belief that one is unique, and in turn, this may give rise to feelings of invulnerability. Ultimately, the two marked characteristics of personal fable are feelings of uniqueness and invulnerability. Or as David Elkind states, "this complex of beliefs in the uniqueness of (the adolescent's) feelings and of his or her immortality might be called a 'personal fable', a story which he or she tells himself and which is not true."

== Early literature on adolescent egocentrism and cognitive development ==
Elkind's work with the personal fable stemmed from Piaget's theory of cognitive development, which describes egocentrism as a lack of differentiation in a given area of subject-object interaction. According to Elkind, in conjunction with Piaget's theory, adolescent egocentrism is to be understood in the context of ontogeny (referring to the development of an organism across its lifespan). These ontogenetic changes in egocentrism are thought to drive the development of logical and formal operational thinking. Elkind described an operation as a "mental tool whose products, series, class hierarchies, conservations, etc., are not directly derived from experience." However, a child in the concrete operational stage is not able to differentiate between these mental constructs and reality (their experiences). For instance, a child in the concrete operational stage may understand that a dog is an animal, but not all animals are dogs; however, the child is not able to grasp a hypothetical concept such as "suppose that dogs were humans". The child is likely to respond "but dogs aren't humans, they are animals."

According to Elkind, the onset of adolescent egocentrism is brought on by the emergence of the formal operational stage, which allows the adolescent to mentally construct hypotheses that are contrary to reality. It is at the onset of adolescence that the individual is "freed" from the confines of concrete thought, and begins to be able to grasp abstract or hypothetical concepts (thus the formal operational way of thinking arises). Here, the individual is now able to imagine the hypothetical situation involving dogs as humans and not animals. Thus, the individual is also able to imagine, and even come to believe, hypothetical situations in which everyone is as concerned with them as they are, and in which they are unique and invulnerable when compared to others. Such contrary-to-fact propositions are what characterize the personal fable.

=== Egocentrism and the formal operational stage of cognition ===
Elkind proposed the concept of teenage egocentrism, which he believes occurs during the transition to Piaget's formal operational stage of cognition (the ultimate stage in which the individual is capable of abstract thinking: hypothetical and deductive reasoning). Although the construct is still widely used in research today, there is no evidence that adolescent egocentrism follows any age-related pattern (as would be implied by the assumption that it disappears when adolescents enter the formal operational stage, a stage that some individuals never reach).

== In early, middle, and late adolescence ==
The onset of adolescent egocentrism tends to occur at about age 11–13 which is considered early adolescence. Since an adolescent is thought to develop the formal operational stage of thinking during this time, the personal fable phenomenon is thought to develop as well. There are studies that support this hypothesis, showing that it is during early adolescence that the personal fable is most prominent (this includes both the uniqueness and invulnerability aspects of personal fable). It has also been shown that both feelings of uniqueness and invulnerability increase significantly from age 11 to age 13.

Middle adolescence is generally considered to be around the age range of 14–16. Past research has demonstrated that personal fable peaks at about age 13 during early adolescence. It has also been speculated that the personal fable phenomenon ought to decline as one moves into middle and then late adolescence.

Late adolescence is considered to range from the age of 17 to about 23. Although Elkind (1967) speculated that the personal fable tends to decrease in late adolescence, there had been evidence of a possible re-emergence of the personal fable (or at least adolescent egocentrism) during late adolescence. It is hypothesized that this re-occurrence of adolescent egocentrism may act as a coping mechanism during the transition to new educational and social contexts (moving away to college, for example). Current research into the prevalence of the personal fable in late adolescence is not conclusive on this point. An additional study was done to analyze whether or not personal fable (and imaginary audience) decreased, increased, or remained stable across an age range from sixth grade to college. The results showed that there was no significant difference between age groups with regards to the personal fable phenomenon, although it did seem to decline slightly. Also, the results showed that the imaginary audience phenomenon seems to decrease as one ages, more so than personal fable. Furthermore, there was a study conducted to analyze the gender differences with regards to the chronicity (the pattern of the behavior across time) of the personal fable phenomenon across early, middle, and late adolescence. The results showed that the personal fable phenomenon, including invulnerability and uniqueness, tends to decrease as an individual moves into middle and late adolescence more so for females than for males.

== Gender differences ==
There has been conflicting evidence of a slight difference between genders in the uniqueness aspect of personal fable. Specifically, females seem to have a higher sense of uniqueness than male adolescents. However, there has also been conflicting evidence suggesting that adolescent boys tend to feel unique more often than adolescent girls. The study which found this conflicting evidence also found that male adolescents also felt more omnipotent (where the adolescent may feel that he is in complete control, all-powerful, and knows everything) when compared to girls. There is presently no knowledge of replication of this finding. Another study found that there was no significant difference between male and female adolescents with regards to the personal fable in general. In regards to the invulnerability aspect of the personal fable, it appears that boys tend to have higher instances of feelings pertaining to invulnerability and risk-taking than girls do. With feelings of invulnerability, it can be said that an adolescent is more likely to participate in risk behavior. A study was done to analyze the role gender plays in sexual risk-taking. The results indicated that females had a higher instance of sexual risk taking (which involved sexual intercourse at a younger age and not using contraception). This finding is somewhat incongruent with the finding that boys tend to have higher feelings of invulnerability (and thus risk-taking behavior) than girls.

== Risk-taking in adolescence ==
Adolescence was once believed to be a time of stress and turmoil. Although this is sometimes the case, research has shown that most adolescents rate their experiences as enjoyable and that the storm and stress of adolescence actually occurs at a fairly low rate and discontinuously. Nonetheless, adolescence is still a time of significant change and development on all levels (psychological, social and biological). Along with all these changes adolescents are faced with situations in which they must make important choices and decisions. Namely, decisions made regarding risky behaviors become more prevalent at this time. Adolescents are faced with decisions on whether to make an effort to have safe sex and how to react to peer pressure regarding substance abuse.

Research suggests that when faced with a decision, adolescents perceive risks but they do not incorporate these into their decision making process. It has been suggested that egocentrism plays a significant role in this lack of risk evaluation. The widespread effect of the correlation between the personal fable and risk-taking behaviors is evident when we consider it has been identified in various cultures, such as the Japanese culture. A study done among Japanese college students found a direct path from egocentrism to health-endangering behaviors. Thus, even though universality can in no way be assumed, it is noteworthy that the correlation has been identified in different parts of the world.

Support for the hypothesis that egocentrism, and the personality fable more specifically, predict risk-taking behaviors is considerable in North America. In fact, the personal fable is commonly associated with risk-taking in research It has been established that speciality and invulnerability are significant predictors of risk. Research has found that egocentrism increased significantly with age and that the personal fable was positively correlated with risk-taking. Male students revealed significantly higher rates of invulnerability. The correlation between the personal fable and risk taking is considered to be of utmost importance. A valid and reliable measure of the personal fable would be an invaluable aid to assessing adolescent risk-taking potential and preventive intervention.

=== Potential positive factors of the personal fable ===
Research has come to distinguish three main subtypes of the personal fable. Omnipotence relates to the adolescent believing he has great authority or power (i.e. he is capable of what most others are not). Invulnerability is just that: the adolescent believes he cannot be harmed or affected in the ways others can. And finally, uniqueness is the adolescent's belief that he and his experiences are novel and unique to him (i.e. no one else could possibly relate). Distinguishing between the personal fable's three subtypes has merit. Research has shown that omnipotence does not seem to be related to delinquent behavior such as substance use, nor to depression or suicidal ideation. In fact, omnipotence is suggested to act as a protective factor, allowing for superior adjustment, high coping skills and self-worth. Contrary to omnipotence, invulnerability relates to risk behavior and delinquency, and uniqueness, which is more prevalent in girls, is related to depression and suicidal ideation (and is found to increase with age). Research has focused significantly more on the personal fable's negative effects and it is important to consider pursuing omnipotence to capitalize on its positive results.

Looking at each subtype of the personal fable – invulnerability, omnipotence and uniqueness – revealed that invulnerability was highly correlated with externalizing behaviors, namely risk-taking (i.e. delinquency and substance use). Personal fable as a whole was found to be a multidimensional construct, contrary to the belief of it being invariably negative. Omnipotence was not correlated with any negative outcomes and in fact was correlated with superior adjustment and feelings of self-worth. Uniqueness (more prevalent in females) was highly correlated with depression and suicidal ideation. Therefore, although a certain subset of the personal fable was once again found to significantly predict involvement in risky behavior, further examination into the multidimensionality of the personal fable is recommended. Particularly, examining whether omnipotence may in fact aid in healthy development and appropriate risk taking would be of utmost importance.

An Australian research brought into play the transtheoretical model (a model used to determine an individual's level of readiness and commitment to changing their behaviors to healthier alternatives) in conjunction with the personal fable to examine smoking and implications for smoking cessation. The researchers found that the personal fable is consistently associated with unhealthy and high risk behaviors. Findings from their study provide mixed results however. Although pre-contemplative smokers (individuals believing they do not exhibit any problem behavior) revealed high levels of omnipotence, ex-smokers did as well. These results suggest personal fable actually plays an important role in smoking cessation and researchers should consider re-evaluating the constructs to determine whether omnipotence could become stronger after smoking cessation (omnipotence in this particular case being the individual's belief that he can stop smoking whenever he wants). In the end, it is suggested the personal fable might be better conceptualized as encompassing both adaptive and maladaptive beliefs

=== Preventive efforts ===
Studies examining egocentrism's effect on risk awareness/health promotion messages' effectiveness revealed that egocentrism may inhibit deep cognitive processing of these messages. It is contended that explicit messages may not work best for adolescent audiences, despite this being the chosen form. The adolescent needs to be involved in the decision-making process by being presented with a message encouraging discussion and deep elaboration of behaviors and their outcomes. In other words, the message should implicitly encourage non-egocentric thought. In fact, open-ended messages, as opposed to messages scaring, teaching or providing answers, resulted in greater retention of the intended message and in general a reduced intention of risk taking behavior. However this effect was somewhat reduced among male participants.

== Identity development and personal fable ==
As mentioned, the personal fable is an important process that every adolescent experiences and it plays an important role in the adolescent's self-perception in all life stages. Research has shown the personal fable to affect identity development specifically. When it comes to identity, adolescent egocentrism is considered an important construct, especially given its relation to self-compassion. Adolescents gradually develop cognitive skills which allow them to understand or speculate what others are thinking. In other words, adolescents develop theory of mind.

Specifically, theory of mind is an individual's ability to understand another's actions, thoughts, desires, and to hypothesize on their intentions. This construct has been found to emerge once a child reaching three to four years of age and continues to develop until adolescence. Müge Artar conducted a study comparing adolescents identified as having higher levels of egocentrism with adolescents exhibiting more emotional inference and looked into their relationships with their parents. An adolescent's ability to infer a family member's thoughts is considered an important developmental stage. Social-emotional questions were based on the adolescents' understanding of their mother and father's beliefs. Participants were asked questions such as "When you have problems with your mother/father, what does your mother/father feel? What do you feel? Does your mother/father think what you feel?" Most of the adolescents perceived their relationship with parents relevantly and also accurately perceived images about family network.

It can be inferred then that theory of mind acts as a counter to egocentrism. Where egocentrism revolves around the individual and everything in relation to one's own perspective, theory of mind allows for the inclusion of the fact that other people have differing viewpoints.

== Self-esteem, self-compassion and the personal fable ==
Elkind's work on egocentrism was in a sense an expansion and further development of Piagetian theories on the subject. Egocentrism as Piaget describes it "generally refers to a lack of differentiation in some area of subject-object interaction". Both Piaget and Elkind recognize that egocentrism applies to all developmental stages from infancy to childhood, to adolescence to adulthood and beyond. However at each developmental stage, egocentrism manifests its characteristics in different ways, depending on the end goals of that particular stage.

During adolescence, formal operations are developing and become more intact and present in thinking processes. According to Piaget, these formal operations allow for "the young person to construct all the possibilities in a system and construct contrary-to-fact propositions". Elkind adds that "they also enable [the adolescent] to conceptualize his own thought, to take his mental constructions as objects and reason about them". These new thinking processes are believed to begin in early adolescences around ages 11–12. Another characteristic of formal operations that directly applies to adolescence egocentrism is the matter that during this stage, as discussed above, adolescents are conceptualizing the thoughts of those around them, in a sense, putting themselves into someone else's shoes in order to possibly understand their views. However, since adolescence is a stage in which the youth is primarily concerned with themselves and their own personal views and feelings, these shortfalls of formal operations result in the adolescent "fail[ing] to differentiate between what others are thinking about and his own mental preoccupations, he assumes that other people are as obsessed with his behavior and appearance as he is himself". As mentioned earlier, these sentiments are the basis of another feature of adolescent egocentrism: the imaginary audience.

=== Self-compassion and personal fable ===
"Self-compassion is an adaptive way of relating to the self when considering personal inadequacies or difficult life circumstances." Self-compassion refers to the ability to hold one's feelings of suffering with a sense of warmth, connection, and concern. Neff, K.D.(2003b) has proposed three major components of self-compassion. The first is self-kindness, which refers to the ability to treat oneself with care and understanding rather than harsh self-judgment. The second involves a sense of common humanity, recognizing that imperfection is a shared aspect of the human experience rather than feeling isolated by one's failures. The third component of self-compassion is mindfulness, which involves holding one's present-moment experience in balanced perspective rather than exaggerating the dramatic story-line of one's suffering. At the same time, personal fable is theorized to lead to a lack of self-compassion if one's difficulties and failings are not faced and given meaning to be human. Self-compassion may also be able to mediate personal well-being. A study of 522 individuals from ages 14-24 sought to define this link between personal mental health and presence of self-compassion. The group was divided into 235 participants from ages 14 to 17 and 287 participants from ages 19 to 24. The subjects were gathered from high schools and colleges in a single city and were not compensated. Their socioeconomic backgrounds were largely middle-class (Neff & McGehee's). Evidence found that self-compassion could explain a significant variance in well-being, predicting it even better than variables of maternal support.

=== Self-esteem and self-compassion ===
Adolescent egocentrism and personal fable immensely affect the development of self-esteem and self-compassion during adolescence. During this particular stage, self-esteem and self-compassion of an adolescent are developing and changing constantly and many factors influence their development. According to Kristin Neff, self-esteem can be defined as judgments and comparisons stemming from evaluations of self-worth, while also evaluating personal performances in comparison to set standards, and perceiving how others evaluate them to determine how much one likes the self. She goes on to further explain that self-compassion has three main components: "(a) self-kindness – being kind and understanding toward oneself in instances of pain or failure rather than being harshly self-critical, (b) common humanity – perceiving one's experiences as part of the larger human experience rather than seeing them as separating and isolating, (c) mindfulness – holding painful thoughts and feelings in balanced awareness rather than over-identifying with them. Self-compassion is an emotionally positive self-attitude that is assumed to protect against the negative consequences of self-judgment, isolation, and rumination (such as depression). With a basic understanding of these two concepts, self-esteem and self-compassion, it becomes evident that adolescent egocentrism and personal fable have important consequences and affect many aspects of adolescent development.

Neff argues that although there are similarities in self-esteem and self-compassion, the latter contains fewer pitfalls than the former. She asserts that self-compassion is "not based on the performance evaluations of self and others or the congruence with ideal standard... it takes the entire self-evaluation process out of the picture, focusing on feelings of compassion toward oneself and the recognition of one's common humanity rather than making self-judgments". Furthermore, high self-compassion seems to counteract certain negative concerns of extremely high self-esteem such as narcissism and self-centeredness. Neff's studies also contend that those with high self-compassion have greater psychological health than those with lower levels of self-compassion, "because the inevitable pain and sense of failure that is experienced by all individuals is not amplified and perpetuated through harsh self-condemnation... this supportive attitude toward oneself should be associated with a variety of beneficial psychological outcomes, such as less depression, less anxiety, less neurotic perfectionism, and greater life satisfaction".

With these understandings of self-esteem and self-compassion during adolescence, we can see how personal fable and egocentrism plays a role in the development of these self-concepts can greatly impact the way an adolescent views themselves and who they believe they are. If one is using personal fable to an extent that they constantly believe that nobody understands them, they are the only one who is going through "this" or they just feel alone all the time, this can very negatively affect their personal growth, self-esteem and self-compassion during adolescence. On the other hand, if they feel that they have a good support system in their family, friends, school, etc., development of self-esteem and self-compassion will likely take a much more positive route and the adolescent will likely have a well rounded sense of themselves. As Neff states, "individuals with high levels of self-compassion should have higher 'true self-esteem'". Thus the development that occurs ongoing during adolescence can most accurately be described as the interactions of multiple systems, functions, and abstract processes that occur together, separately or at any other combination.

=== Gender differences in the development of self-esteem ===
A study by Ronald L. Mullis and Paula Chapman examined gender differences pertaining to the development of self-esteem in adolescents. The results of their study shows "the problem-solving skills of adolescents change and improve with age as a function of cognitive development and social experience". They found that the male adolescents used more wishful thinking in their coping strategies than did female adolescents, who tended to rely more on social supports as a coping strategy." Furthermore they found that youths with lower levels of self-esteem relied more on emotional-based coping methods. The study gives "ventilation of feelings" as an example, while those with high levels of self-esteem more readily utilized skills associated with problem solving and higher levels of formal operations as coping strategies.

== Identity exploration and emerging adulthood ==
Arnett (2000) suggested that in adolescents' identity exploration, it is more transient and tentative. (Arnett, 2000). Adolescent dating is recreational in nature, involving group activities. They are still exploring their identity before asking the question "Given the kind of person I am, what kind of person do I wish to have a partner through life?" (Arnett, 2000, p. 473). With increasing opportunities to pursue higher education and greater delays in marriage and childbirth (Arnett, 2007), there is now more time, beyond adolescence, for activities and reflections surrounding self-definition and identity development. (Kose, Papouchis & Fireman). When adolescents start to develop the cognitive skill to understand others' feelings and what they are thinking, also known as theory of mind. This helps adolescents to develop their own sense of self and their own way of perceiving the world. It is normal for adolescents to feel personal fable. It is what drives them to develop their own sets of skills to understand others' thoughts and feelings. And this also triggers their ability to seek out their own identity. Arnett (2000) argues that as the age of adulthood had been moved back and the age of becoming an adult is getting older than the past. There is more time for adolescents to explore themselves; he thought of this period of exploration as seemingly a time when perspective-taking skills are being sharpened most dramatically. Personal fable also helps adolescents transition from exploring oneself to seeking extended experimentation, particularly in relationships, during the transition of young adulthood. Elkind though thought that the extension period for identity exploration and less pressure to take on typical adult roles teens are special and invulnerable, but are not feeling on center stage as often felt by the adolescents. (Elkind et al., Lapsley et al., 1989). As an example, some young adults might still have the feeling that they are special inside and invulnerable, but they are less likely to engage in risky behaviors. Some current findings suggest that increases in personal fable ideation are associated with increases in identity and cognitive formal operations, particularly among this young adult age group. Increase in personal fable ideation, feelings of invulnerability, among emerging adults may explain the heightened level of maladaptive behaviors among this group. For example, studies might explore how faulty thinking, particularly personal fable ideation, is related to risk behavior and how interventions can be tailored to address the type of thinking if leading to harmful outcomes for the young adults (18–25 years old). Apparently inconsistent findings might be resolved by improvements in ways of measuring individual differences in the personal fable. Young adults have to be able to cope with an identity crisis, at the same time knowing that personal fable is driving them to risky behaviors. If young adults do not cope with the inner conflicts, they will be likely to involve in risk-behaviors. Current research indicates that the age of emerging adulthood may extend later than previously thought, and the personal fable also appears to persist into emerging adulthood. The persistence of the personal fable could contribute to continued risk-taking behavior even though that age group physically appears to be adult.

== See also ==
- Chūnibyō
- Dunning–Kruger effect
- God complex
- Imaginary audience
