= Imaginary audience =

Concept in developmental psychology

The imaginary audience refers to a psychological state where an individual imagines or believes that multitudes of people are listening to or watching them. It is one of the mental constructs in David Elkind's idea of adolescent egocentrism (along with the personal fable). Though the term refers to an experience exhibited in young adolescence as part of development, people of any age may harbor a fantasy of an imaginary audience.

== Early history ==
David Elkind coined the term "imaginary audience" in 1967. The basic premise of the topic is that people who are experiencing it feel that their behavior or actions are the main focus of other people's attention. It is defined as how willing a child is to reveal alternative forms of themselves. The imaginary audience is a psychological concept common to the adolescent stage of human development. It refers to the belief that a person is under constant, close observation by peers, family, and strangers. This imaginary audience is proposed to account for a variety of adolescent behaviors and experiences, such as heightened self-consciousness, distortions of others' views of the self, and a tendency toward conformity and faddisms. This act stems from the concept of ego-centrism in adolescents.

Elkind studied the effects of imaginary audience and measured it using the Imaginary Audience Scale (IAS). The results of his research showed that boys were more willing than girls to express different sides of themselves to an audience. This apprehension from girls has given rise to further research on the value of privacy to girls. Imaginary audience influences behavior later in life in regards to risky behaviors and decision-making techniques. A possibility is that imaginary audience is correlated with a fear of evaluation or self-representation effects on self-esteem.

== Description ==
The phenomenon stems from egocentrism and is closely related to another topic called 'personal fable' (personal fable involves a sense of uniqueness). Imaginary audience effects are not a neurological disorder, but more a personality or developmental stage of life. It is not aroused by a life event; rather it is a part of the developmental process throughout adolescence. It is a natural part of the process of developing a healthy understanding of one's relationship with the world. Most people will eventually gain a more realistic perspective on the roles they play in their peer groups as they mature. This natural developmental process can lead to high paranoia about whether the adolescent is being watched, if they are doing a task right and if people are judging them. Imaginary audience will likely cease before adolescence ends, as it is a huge part of personality development. Imaginary audience can be as simple as having to change multiple times in the morning because the adolescent still feels unsatisfactory about arriving at a destination about their appearance even though they will appear the same as everyone else.

Jean Piaget, a Swiss developmental psychologist known for his epistemological studies with children, states that every child experiences imaginary audience during the preoperational stage of development. He also said that children will outgrow this stage by age 7, but as we know now this stage lasts much longer than that. Imaginary audience happens because young children believe others see what they see, know what they know, hear what they hear, and feel what they feel. The extremes to which adolescents experience an imaginary audience, however, varies from child to child. Some children are considered to be more "egocentric" than others and experience more of an extreme imaginary audience or have more of an elaborate personal fable. Therefore, children then subconsciously put more value on the idea that everyone cares about what they are doing at all times. This is very common in adolescents during this level of development as the child is going through Erik Erikson's identity vs. identity confusion.

The child is struggling to figure out their identity and formulating congruent values, beliefs, morals, political views, and religious views. So, on top of experiencing an identity moratorium in which they are exploring different identities, children feel they are constantly being watched or evaluated by those around them. This leads to intense pressure being placed on the child and may also influence later self-esteem.

Gerald Adams and Randy Jones conducted a study to test imaginary audience behavior. They tested total of 115 male and female adolescents between the ages of 11 and 18 using an empathy scale, social sensitivity scale, and a measure of social desirability. They stated Imaginary audience is seen most in teens going through puberty where their bodies are changing rapidly and they are concerned with how everyone is viewing their change. The relationship between age, imaginary audience behavior and self-reported concerns about body image during adolescence questions certain assumptions underlying the development of the Imaginary Audience Behavior scale.

== See also ==
- Ideas and delusions of reference - an unhealthy level of interpreting ordinary events as personally significant
- Gaze
- Personal fable
- Spotlight effect - the same experience independent of age
- Truman Show delusion
