= Climax, New York =

- Hamlet
- Location within New York Location within the United States
- Coordinates: 42°21′57″N 73°51′3″W
- Country: United States
- State: New York
- County: Greene
- Town: Coxsackie
- Elevation: 246 ft (75 m)
- Time zone: UTC-5 (Eastern (EST))
  - Summer (DST): UTC-4 (EDT)
- ZIP code: 12042
- Area code: 518
- GNIS feature ID: 946882

Climax is a hamlet in the town of Coxsackie, Greene County, New York, United States. The zipcode is 12042.
