= Ellen Galinsky =

American writer

Ellen Galinsky (born April 1942) is an American author known for her work in family-related studies, specifically parenthood and child-care. Galinsky is the author of over 100 books and reports, as well as more than 300 articles.

Galinsky is the co-founder of Families and Work Institute and currently serves as its president and director. The Families and Work Institute is a non-profit organization, founded in 1989, with a focus on providing research on today's workplace, family, and community.

== Biography ==
=== Early life and education ===
Ellen Galinsky was born on April 24, 1942, to Melvin H. and Leora May. Galinsky was born in Pittsburgh, Pennsylvania. On August 15, 1965, Galinsky was married to Norman Galinsky. The couple has two children, Philip and Lara.

Galinsky has received a Bachelor of Arts in child studies from Vassar College and a Master of Science in Child Development from Bank Street College of Education.

=== Employment ===
Galinsky was a teacher at the Bank Street College of Education for 25 years. She is the Chief Science Officer and Executive Director for the Bezos Family Foundation.

Galinsky co-founded and currently serves as president of the Families and Work Institute.

== Main Ideas ==
=== Six Stages of Parenthood ===
In 1987, Galinsky was the first to postulate that parents develop as their children grow. She devised six stages of parenthood and describes them in her book, The Six Stages of Parenthood. Galinsky's work on this book was influenced by Erik Erikson and Daniel Levinson.

==== The Image-Making Stage ====
This stage occurs during pregnancy and is characterized by the parents imaging what parenthood will look like. During this stage, parents consider what their roles will be and how they will parent. Further, they plan and make changes necessary for the care of an infant.

==== The Nurturing Stage ====
The nurturing stage begins when the child is born. It is characterized by forming a relationship and attachment with the child. Other relationships must be recreated to include their new child. This stage is the most challenging because their infant is completely dependent on the parent.

==== The Authority Stage ====
This stage happens when the child is two through five years old. This stage is characterized by rule-making and what to do when rules are broken. During this stage, kids are growing a sense of autonomy and the parents job is to decide how much autonomy to give them.

==== The Interpretive Stage ====
This stage occurs during middle childhood. During this stage, parents must decide where the kid should go to school, what extracurricular activities to be involved in, and more. This stage is characterized by parents reflecting on their parenting strategies and whether they have been successful. Further, parents must help their kids become more independent and guide them in making their own decisions.

==== The Interdependent Stage ====
This stage occurs when the child is a teenager. It is characterized by the parent and child sharing control and authority. The child starts making their own choices and the parent gives the child more freedoms.

==== The Departure Stage ====
This stage occurs when the eldest child first moves out until the youngest child moves out. This stage is characterized by transition and reflection. The role of parent becomes less important to their identity.

=== Seven Essential Life Skills Every Child Needs ===
One of the books Galinsky wrote is Mind in the Making: The Seven Essential Life Skills Every Child Needs (2010). This book outlines seven skills that will help children develop successfully. These seven skills are focus and self control, perspective taking, communication, making connections, critical thinking, taking on challenges, self-directed engaged learning.

== Works ==
=== Books ===
- Galinsky, Ellen. Mind in the Making: The Seven Essential Life Skills Every Child Needs. United States, HarperCollins, 2010.
- Galinsky, Ellen. The Six Stages Of Parenthood. United States, Hachette Books, 1987.
- Galinsky, Ellen. Ask the Children: The Breakthrough Study That Reveals How to Succeed at Work and Parenting. United States, HarperCollins, 2000.
- Galinsky, Ellen. Ask the children : what America's children really think about working parents. New York, HarperCollins, 1999.
- David, Judy, and Galinsky, Ellen. The Preschool Years: Family Strategies That Work—From Experts and Parents. United States, Random House Publishing Group, 1990.

== Media and conferences ==
Galinsky has appeared on several television programs. She has been on PBS, CBS Evening News with Katie Couric, The Oprah Winfrey Show, Good Morning America, and World News Tonight. Additionally, Galinsky has appeared on Mister Roger's talks to parents, hosted by Fred Rogers, and What Every Baby Knows, hosted by T. Berry Brazelton. Galinsky has also spoken at White House Conference on five occasions.

== Awards and recognition ==
- Distinguished Achievement Award from Vassar College (2004)
- Outstanding Volunteer Award (2005)
- Outstanding Professional Achievement (2005)
- SECA Berry T. Brazelton Friend of Children Award (2014)
- Lifetime Achievement Award (2022)

== Criticisms ==
There is little research on developing parenthood. As of right now, the six stages are theoretical. Further, it is unknown whether these stages are generalizable across different demographics. There is also no research on differences in each stage.
