= Mark G. Frank =

American communication professor

- Education: Cornell University (PhD)
- Known for: Research in deception and nonverbal communication
- Scientific career
- Fields: Communication & Psychology
- Workplaces: University at Buffalo, SUNY
- Thesis: (1989)
- Doctoral advisors: Thomas Gilovich

Mark G. Frank (bonrn 1961) is an American communication professor and department chair, and an expert on human nonverbal communication, emotion, and deception. He conducts research and does training on micro expressions of emotion and of the face. His research studies include other nonverbal indicators of deception throughout the rest of the body. He is the Director of the Communication Science Center research laboratory that is located on the North Campus of the University at Buffalo. Under his guidance, a team of graduate researchers conduct experiments and studies for private and government entities. Frank uses his expertise in communication and psychology to assist law enforcement agencies in monitoring both verbal and nonverbal communication.

== Early life and influences ==
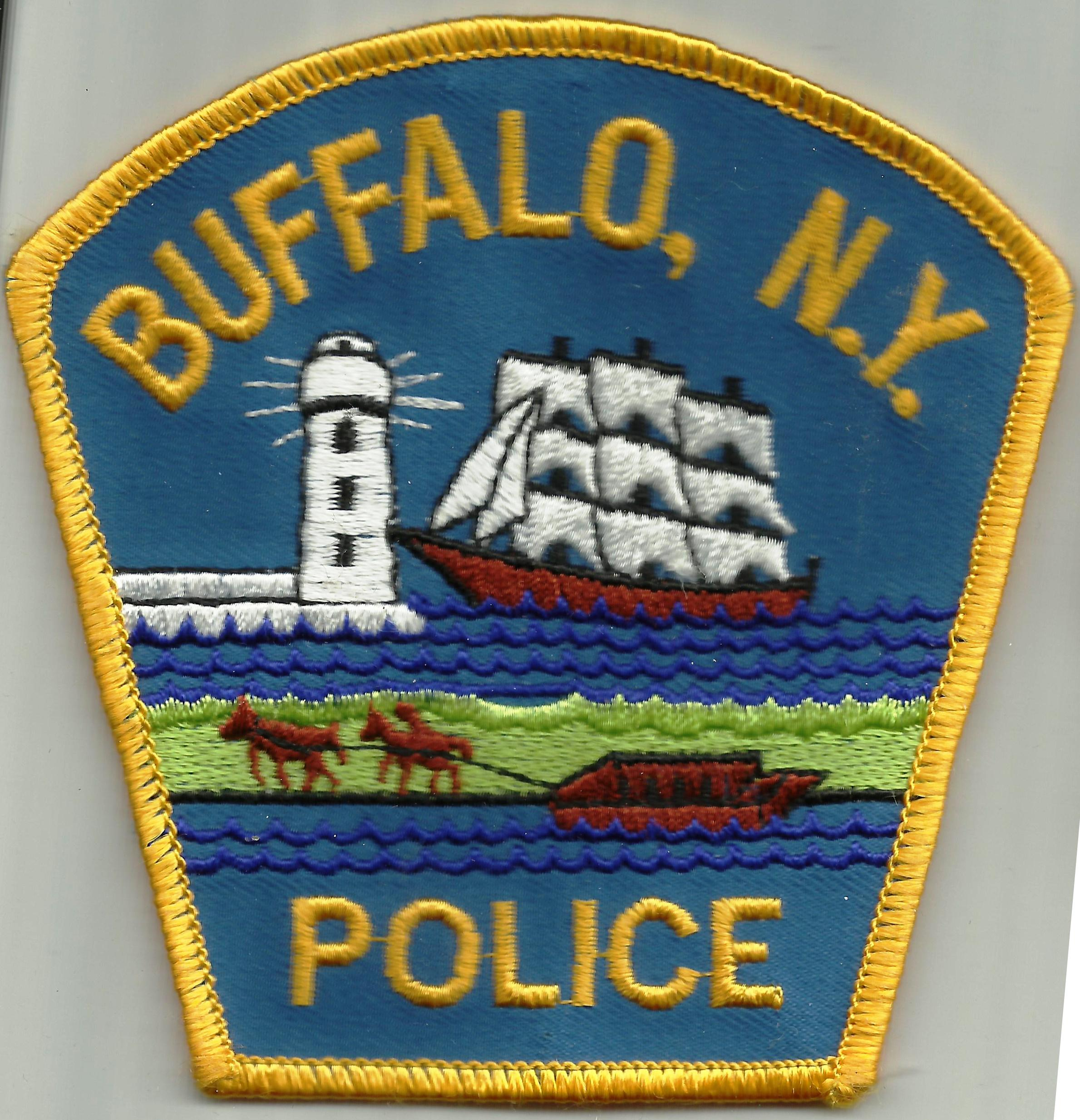
Buffalo NY Police Patch Buffalo, NY, 2012.

Mark G. Frank was born in Buffalo, New York. His father was a Buffalo Police officer. During college, Frank worked as a bouncer at the local bars, where his interest in the field of communication began to evolve. He began to study and learn the behaviors of underage patrons who tried to enter the establishment using fake identification thereby fostering his ability to determine when others were lying. From here, Frank went on to study hours of video footage of criminals. Studying how criminals interacted, he learned to pick up on subtle micro expressions that leak out when people are telling a lie.

In 1983, Frank graduated from the University at Buffalo with a bachelor's degree in psychology. He then earned his PhD in Social Psychology from Cornell University in 1989. His dissertation advisor is Thomas Gilovich.

== Academic positions ==
Frank received a National Research Service Award from the National Institute of Mental Health to do postdoctoral research with Paul Ekman who worked in the Psychiatry Department at the University of California at San Francisco Medical School. The two worked on a project called "A Few Can Catch A Liar", which provided the first evidence that some psychologists can achieve high accuracy in catching lies.

Frank joined the School of Psychology at the University of New South Wales in Australia in 1992 and four years later, he accepted a teaching position at Rutgers University.

Frank is a professor at SUNY University at Buffalo in the Department of Communications and the Director of the Department of Communication Science Center.

=== Consulting and training ===
Frank has trained over 1,000 law enforcement agencies in the United States and overseas law enforcement agencies. His training focuses on the role that emotion plays in predicting violence. Frank has also spent time giving workshops to US and foreign judges and magistrates. He presented briefings to the National Academy of Sciences and the US congress on Deception and Counter-Terrorism. Frank has used his findings to discuss, consult with, or train law enforcement agencies, such as the Metropolitan Police Service in London (Scotland Yard), the Nottinghamshire and Kent Constabularies, the National Crime Faculty, Australian Customs, Australian Federal Police, as well as Dutch, Belgian, and Singaporean authorities. In addition, Frank teaches federal agents, interrogators, and other law enforcement officials to accurately interpret the microexpressions on a person's face; Frank calls these microexpressions "hot spots", which are the facial or emotional cues that indicate deception. Frank has said he can only distinguish between people's truth and lies around 70 percent of the time, so he uses the microexpressions more as an indicator where there is an emotion trying to be concealed.

Frank is working with the Transportation Security Administration and other experts in sensor technology. Frank is also working on behavioral screening and Biometrics to make advancements and adjust their behavioral screening program. Frank supervised and co-wrote the study with Hurley, that examined whether subjects could suppress facial actions like eyebrow movements or smiles on command while under scrutiny of a lie catcher. These findings should greatly improve traveler's safety in airports. Using this layering technique greatly increases the change of a terror suspect being caught while going through security This research is being funded by the National Science Foundation and the Department of Homeland Security.

As a founding member of the FBI's Terrorism Research and Analysis Project, Frank has worked with the Department of Homeland Security.

== Micro expressions ==
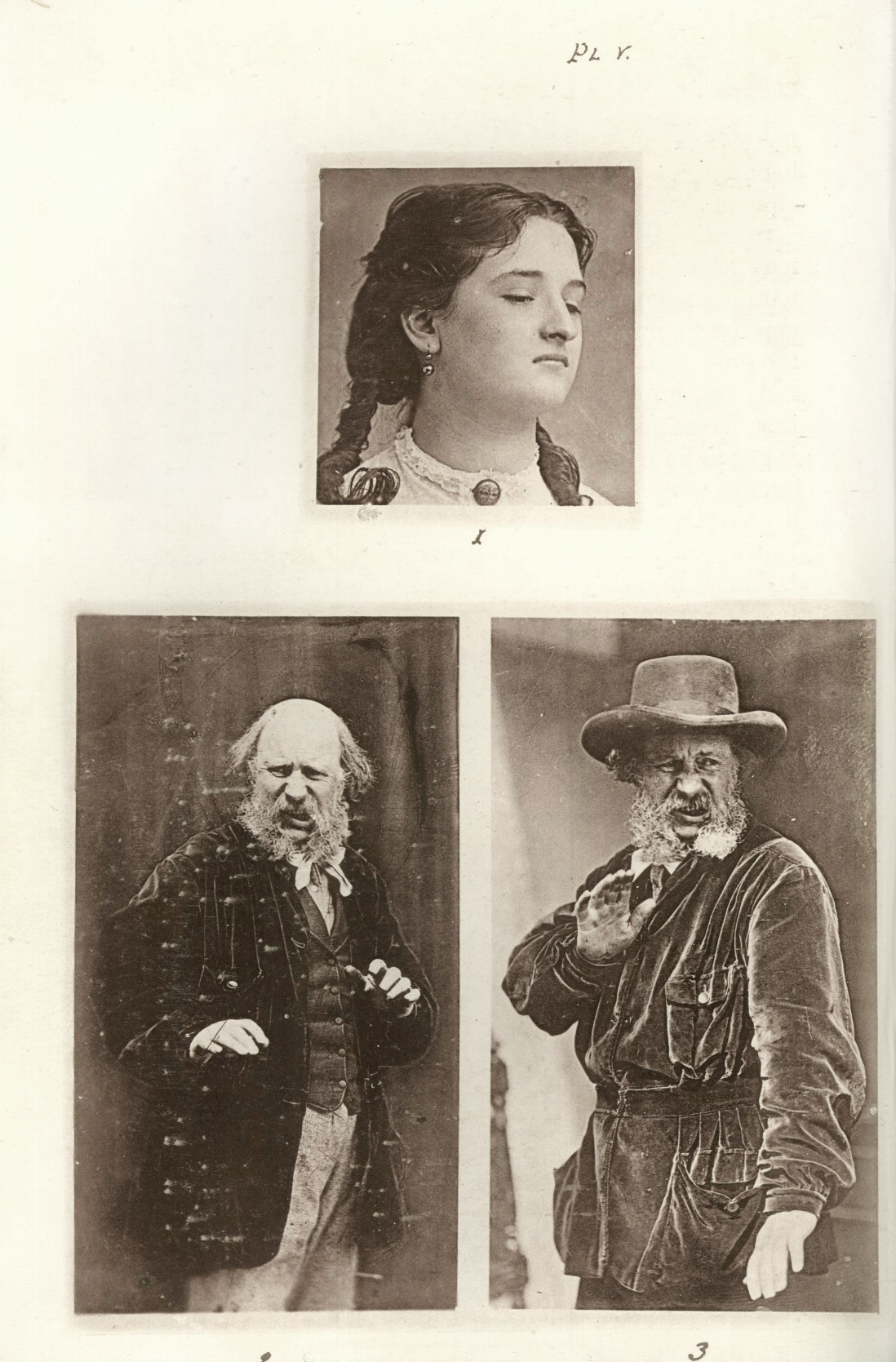
Illustrations of emotions from Charles Darwin's The Expression of the Emotions in Man and Animals, 1872.

Frank works on identifying deception with the help of micro facial movement. He has named 44 movements (sometimes involuntary and specific) that are linked to different emotions related to deception. Some of these include fear, distrust and stress. Frank found that these fleeting expressions/movements are reasonably accurate when it comes to detecting deceit. He says, "Fleeting facial expressions are expressed by minute and unconscious movements of facial muscles like the frontalis, corregator and risorius and these micro-movements, when provoked by underlying emotions, are almost impossible for us to control."

== Communication Science Center ==
In 2005, Frank helped raise funding to create the Communication Science Center at the University at Buffalo, The State University of New York. The Communication Science Center at UB relies heavily upon its use of quantitative research to gather a better understanding of today's communicative world.

== Research and publications ==
Frank has published numerous research papers and articles on facial expressions, emotion, and interpersonal deception with titles including "Facing Facts: Not all lies are created equal" and "Research methods in detecting deception research." Much of this work was funded by The National Science Foundation, Homeland Security, and the Department of Defense.

Frank coauthored and edited the book Nonverbal Communication: Science and applications (2013) with David Matsumoto and Hyi Sung Wang. The book uses current research on nonverbal communication with chapters written by professional practitioners to provide a text that is useful both in the classroom and in applied settings.

Frank supervised and co-wrote a study on "Executing Facial Control During Deception Situations" along with former graduate student Carolyn M. Hurley. Published in early 2011 the study examined if test subjects could conceal facial expressions (i.e. eyebrow movements, smiles) on command while under scrutiny by a 'lie catcher'. For one of his studies, Frank brought in 60 individuals, 33 female and 27 male, and asked them to either take or not take movie tickets, and then lie about it. Some of the subjects were asked to suppress and upper or lower facial activity. The results of the experiment came from a frame-by-frame coding of the facial expression, where Frank found that subjects could reduce the facial activity, but never eliminate it. The study concluded that liars can reduce their facial actions when under scrutiny, however, they cannot suppress all of them.

Frank co-researched a study with Gilovich, called "The Dark Side of Self- and Social Perception: Black Uniforms and Aggression in Professional Sports". Their goal was to test if black uniforms were portrayed as evil or aggressive. They found was that teams with black uniforms were consistently rated as being more aggressive than their counterparts. Frank and Gilovich went to the NFL and NHL and requested official penalty records for all teams from 1970 through the NHL and the NFL. They discovered that in two professional sports, teams wearing black uniforms are in fact the most aggressive teams in their respective sports. The results showed that black jerseys tended to get penalties called on them more than white jerseys.

Frank, along with Daejoong Kim and Sung Tae Kim, conducted a study exploring the changes of emotional-display behavior on different forms of Computer-mediated communication (CMC). The context of the CMC was that of a one-to-one online chat with four different chat conditions – joint-view, no-view, view-in, and view-out. These conditions manipulated visibility and monitor-ability. The results of this study found that the degree of social presence is not influenced by visibility and monitor-ability, although visibility influences the use rate of textual paralinguistic cues. Emotional-display behavior was found to be only partially influenced by monitor-ability.

Frank has published work in "Nature" a weekly science journal. Frank, along with Nancy Etcoff, Paul Ekman, and John Magee worked on an article titled "Lie Detection and Language Comprehension" under the "Brief Communications" section of the journal. The general idea of the article is that "people who don't understand words are better at picking up lies about emotions". Frank concluded that even people who know how to detect lies and can pick on non-verbal cues are no better off than people who are just guessing. They write that people with no language skills are significantly better at detecting lies than those who can understand the language.

Frank is a co-developer of an automated computer system that reads facial expressions. In particular, this new technology automates deceit detection through the analysis of eye movements. He used his findings to consult and train virtually with U.S. Federal Law Enforcement and Intelligence Agencies.

Frank's most recent research deals with people's behaviors in security settings. This includes such things as law enforcement, the legal system and counter-terrorism. The work he contributes to deals with deception clues and how people are good at spotting these clues, and whether or not they can train people to detect the clues as best as they can. Also they try to increase the ability of the automated systems that might assist the recognition of individuals who convey to commit these types of acts.

== Media appearances ==
In May 2000 the documentary reality TV show "The Human Zoo" depicted a character founded on Frank. The show was about the delicate dynamics of meeting new people. It explored the effectiveness of first impressions that are made at job interviews, how an attractive appearance affects how successful someone becomes, the limit of personal space, and facial expressions related to deception.

In August 2006, Frank made a guest appearance on a CBS News segment called "Weeding Out Terrorists" discussing how facial expressions can give away if a person is lying, and also explaining that no behavior always guarantees that someone is lying.
