= David Elkind =

American child psychologist and author

David Elkind (born March 11, 1931) is an American child psychologist and author.

== Life ==
Elkind and his family relocated to California when he was a teenager. He studied at the University of California at Los Angeles and obtained a Bachelor of Arts degree in 1952 and Doctorate in Philosophy in 1955. David also earned an honorary Doctorate in Science at the Rhode Island College in 1987.

A professor at Tufts University, his books — The Hurried Child, The Power of Play and Miseducation — informed early childhood education professionals of the possible dangers of incorporating elementary school curriculum into the very early years of a child's life. By doing so, he argued, teachers and parents alike could lapse into developmentally inappropriate instructional and learning practices that may distort the smooth development of learning. He is associated with the belief of decline of social markers.

== Professional positions ==
David Elkind is professor emeritus of Child Development at Tufts University in Medford, Massachusetts. He was formerly professor of psychology, Psychiatry and Education at the University of Rochester.

Elkind obtained his doctorate at UCLA and then spent a year as David Rapaport's research assistant at the Austen Riggs Center in Stockbridge, Massachusetts. In 1964–65 he was a National Science Foundation Senior Postdoctoral Fellow at Piaget's Institut d'Epistemologie Genetique in Geneva. His research has been in the areas of perceptual, cognitive and social development where he has attempted to build upon the research and theory of Jean Piaget.

Elkind is on the editorial board of a number of scientific journals, and is a consultant to state education departments as well as to government agencies and private foundations. He lectures regularly in the United States, Canada and abroad. He has appeared on The Today Show, The CBS Morning News, Twenty/Twenty, Nightline, Donahue, and The Oprah Winfrey Show. He has been profiled in People and Boston Magazine. Elkind co-hosted the Lifetime television series, Kids These Days. He is past president of the National Association for the Education of Young Children.

== Publications ==
Elkind's bibliography now numbers close to 500 items and includes research, theoretical articles, book chapters and eighteen books. In addition he has published more popular pieces such as children's stories in Jack and Jill, biographies of famous psychologists in the New York Times Magazine, as well as presentations of his own work in Good Housekeeping, Parade and Psychology Today. Some of his recent articles include "Computers and Young Children," "The Authority of the Brain," "The Cosmopolitan School," "On Becoming a Grandfather," and "Thanks for the Memory: The Lasting Value of True Play."

Elkind is known for his books, The Hurried Child, The Power of Play, All Grown Up and No Place to Go, and Miseducation. Grandparenting: Understanding Today's Children was published in November 1989. Parenting Your Teenager and three additional books, Images of the Young Child; Understanding Your Child and a third edition of A Sympathetic Understanding of the Child: Birth to Sixteen appeared in 1993. Ties That Stress: The New Family Imbalance was published in 1994. A second edition of All Grown Up and No Place to Go and Reinventing Childhood: Raising and Educating Children in a Changing World appeared in 1998. A third edition of The Hurried Child came out 2001 and the 25th anniversary edition was published in 2007 along with his newest book The Power of Play: Learning What Comes Naturally.

Elkind was a contributing editor to Parents Magazine.

== Personal ==
Elkind is married to Debbie Elkind, lives on Cape Cod, and has three sons and four grandchildren.

== See also ==
- Developmental psychology
- Imaginary audience
- Personal fable
- Genie (feral child)

Preceded by Docia Zavitkovsky	President of the National Association for the Education of Young Children; 1986–1988	Succeeded by Ellen Galinsky
