= Adolescence =

Human transition from puberty to adult

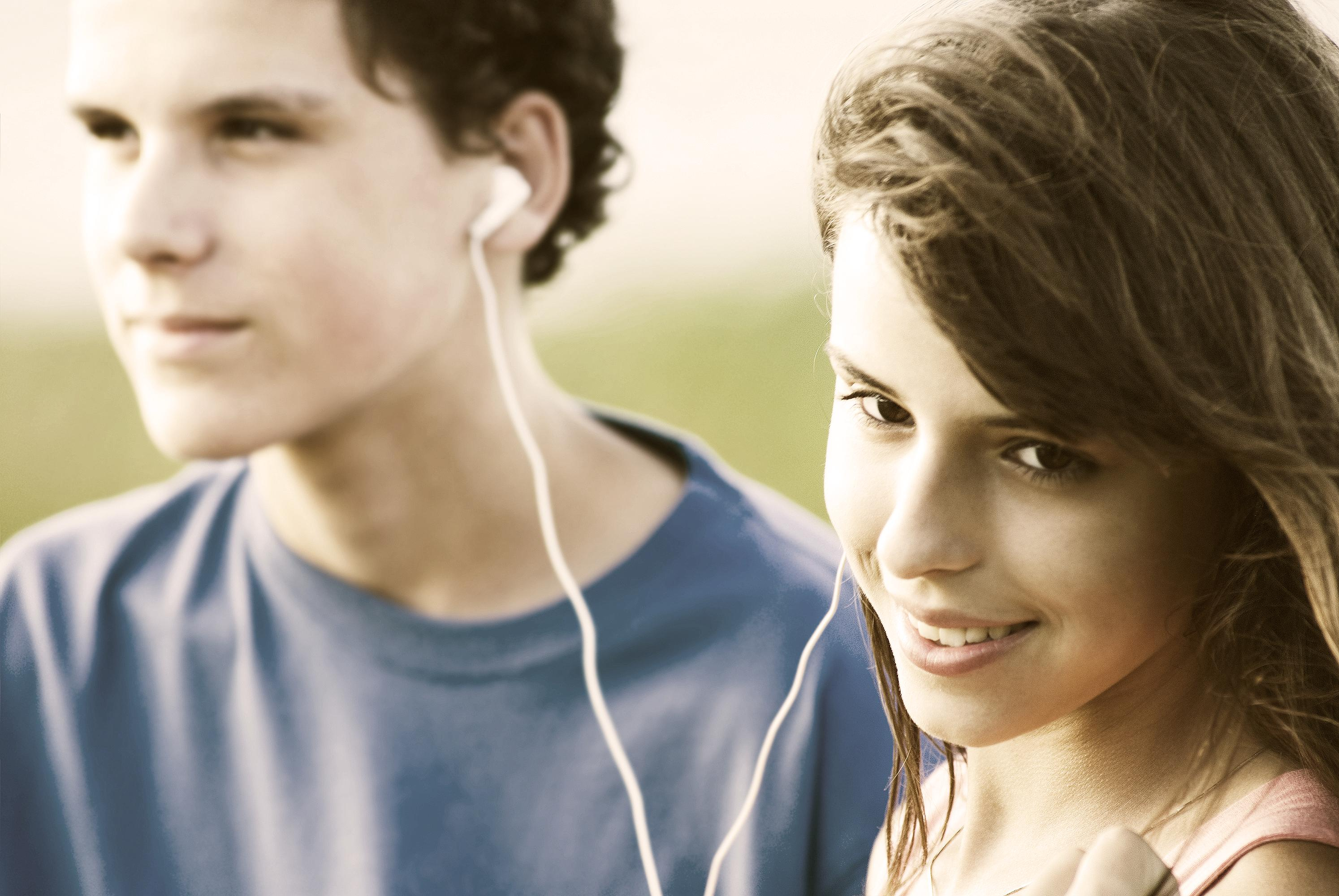
Two adolescents listening to music using earphones

Adolescence (from Latin adolescere 'to mature') is a transitional stage of human physical and psychological development that generally occurs during the period from puberty to adulthood (typically corresponding to the age of majority). Adolescence is usually associated with the teenage years, but its physical, psychological or cultural expressions may begin earlier or end later. Puberty typically begins during preadolescence, particularly in females. Physical growth (particularly in males) and cognitive development can extend past the teens. Age provides only a rough marker of adolescence, and scholars have not agreed upon a precise definition. Some definitions start as early as 10 and end as late as 30. The World Health Organization definition officially designates adolescence as the phase of life from ages 10 to 19.

== Biological development ==
=== Puberty in general ===
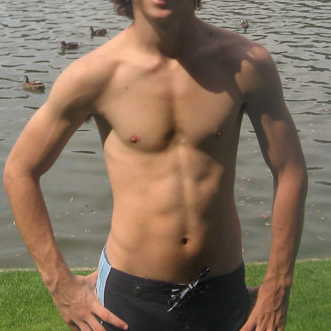
Upper body of a teenage boy. The structure has changed to resemble an adult form.

Puberty is a period of several years in which rapid physical growth and psychological changes occur, culminating in sexual maturity. The average age of onset of puberty is 10–11 for girls and 11–12 for boys. Every person's individual timetable for puberty is influenced primarily by heredity, although environmental factors, such as diet and exercise, also exert some influences. These factors can also contribute to precocious and delayed puberty.

Some of the most significant parts of pubertal development involve distinctive physiological changes in individuals' height, weight, body composition, and circulatory and respiratory systems. These changes are largely influenced by hormonal activity. Hormones play an organizational role, priming the body to behave in a certain way once puberty begins, and an active role, referring to changes in hormones during adolescence that trigger behavioral and physical changes.

Puberty occurs through a long process and begins with a surge in hormone production, which in turn causes a number of physical changes. It is the stage of life characterized by the appearance and development of secondary sex characteristics (for example, a deeper voice and larger Adam's apple in boys, and development of breasts and more curved and prominent hips in girls) and a strong shift in hormonal balance towards an adult state. This is triggered by the pituitary gland, which secretes a surge of hormonal agents into the blood stream, initiating a chain reaction. The male and female gonads are thereby activated, which puts them into a state of rapid growth and development; the triggered gonads now commence mass production of hormones. The testes primarily release testosterone, and the ovaries predominantly release estrogen. The production of these hormones increases gradually until sexual maturation is met. Some boys may develop gynecomastia due to an imbalance of sex hormones, tissue responsiveness or obesity.

Facial hair in males normally appears in a specific order during puberty: The first facial hair to appear tends to grow at the corners of the upper lip, typically between 14 and 16 years of age. It then spreads to form a moustache over the entire upper lip. This is followed by the appearance of hair on the upper part of the cheeks, and the area under the lower lip. The hair eventually spreads to the sides and lower border of the chin, and the rest of the lower face to form a full beard. As with most human biological processes, this specific order may vary among some individuals. Facial hair is often present in late adolescence, around ages 17 and 18, but may not appear until significantly later. Some men do not develop full facial hair for 10 years after puberty. Facial hair continues to get coarser, much darker, and thicker for another 2–4 years after puberty.

The major landmark of puberty for males is spermarche, the first ejaculation, which occurs, on average, at age 13. For females, it is menarche, the onset of menstruation, which typically occurs around age 13, plus or minus two or three years. The age of menarche is influenced by heredity, but a girl's diet and lifestyle contribute as well. Regardless of genes, a girl must have a certain proportion of body fat to attain menarche. Consequently, girls who have a high-fat diet and who are not physically active begin menstruating earlier, on average, than girls whose diet contains less fat and whose activities involve fat reducing exercise (e.g. ballet and gymnastics). Girls who experience malnutrition or are in societies in which children are expected to perform physical labor also begin menstruating at later ages.

The timing of puberty can have important psychological and social consequences. Early maturing boys are usually taller and stronger than their friends. They have the advantage in capturing the attention of potential partners and in being picked first for sports. Pubescent boys often tend to have a good body image, are more confident, secure, and more independent. Late maturing boys can be less confident because of poor body image when comparing themselves to already developed friends and peers. However, early puberty is not always positive for boys; early sexual maturation in boys can be accompanied by increased aggressiveness due to the surge of hormones that affect them. Because they appear older than their peers, pubescent boys may face increased social pressure to conform to adult norms; society may view them as more emotionally advanced, despite the fact that their cognitive and social development may lag behind their appearance. Studies have shown that early maturing boys are more likely to be sexually active and are more likely to participate in risky behaviors.

For girls, early maturation can sometimes lead to increased self-consciousness, a typical aspect in maturing females. Because of their bodies' developing in advance, pubescent girls can become more insecure and dependent. Consequently, girls that reach sexual maturation early are more likely than their peers to develop eating disorders (such as anorexia nervosa and bulimia nervosa). Nearly half of all American high school girls' diets are to lose weight. In addition, girls may have to deal with sexual advances from older boys before they are emotionally and mentally mature. Early-maturing girls may date earlier than late-maturing girls, and so have earlier sexual experiences and more unwanted pregnancies. Earlier-maturing girls are more exposed to alcohol and drug abuse. Those who have had such experiences tend to not perform as well in school as their "inexperienced" peers.

Girls have usually reached full physical development around ages 15–17, while boys usually complete puberty around ages 16–17. Any increase in height beyond the post-pubertal age is uncommon. Girls attain reproductive maturity about four years after the first physical changes of puberty appear. In contrast, boys develop more slowly but continue to grow for about six years after the first visible pubertal changes.

Approximate outline of development periods in childhood and early adulthood development. Adolescence is marked in red at top right.

=== Growth spurt ===
The physical development of teenage girls can be broken down into three distinct stages. At the start, which generally coincides with the beginning of rapid growth, there is the development of breast buds and pubic hair. The peak period of physical growth occurs approximately one year later in concert with stage two of sexual maturity. Approximately 1 to 1.6 years after the onset of secondary sex characteristics, girls enter into the third stage which typically includes menarche. By this time, they will have finished their growth spurt and experience a notable broadening of the hips as well as an adult fat distribution. Additionally, breast development is complete and hair in both the pubic region and armpits (axillary hair) will be darker and more widespread.

Sexual maturation in boys occurs in four stages correlating with characteristic phases of bodily growth. In comparison to girls, it can be tricky to define when exactly sexual development in boys begins. The initial sign of puberty in boys usually is the "fat spurt". The maturing boy gains weight and becomes almost chubby, with a somewhat feminine fat distribution. This probably occurs because estrogen production by the Leydig cells in the testes is stimulated before the more abundant Sertoli cells begin to produce significant amounts of testosterone. During this stage, boys may appear obese and somewhat awkward physically. Approximately 1 year after the scrotum begins to increase in size, stage II can be seen. During this time, there is a redistribution of subcutaneous fat and the start of pubic hair growth. Following 8 to 12 months of the peak velocity in height gain, stage III ensues. At this time, axillary hair appears and facial hair appears on the upper lip only. A spurt in muscle growth also occurs, along with a continued decrease in subcutaneous fat and an obviously harder and more angular body form. Pubic hair distribution appears more adult but has not yet spread to the medial area of the thighs. The penis and scrotum are near adult size. Stage IV for boys, which occurs anywhere from 15 to 24 months after stage III, is difficult to pinpoint. At this time, the spurt of growth in height ends. There is facial hair on the chin and the upper lip, adult distribution and color of pubic and axillary hair, and a further increase in muscular strength.

The adolescent growth spurt is a rapid increase in the individual's height and weight during puberty resulting from the simultaneous release of growth hormones, thyroid hormones, and androgens. Males experience their growth spurt about two years later, on average, than females. During their peak height velocity (the time of most rapid growth), adolescents grow at a growth rate nearly identical to that of a toddler—typically 8.8–11.8 cm (3.5–4.6 in) per year for males (about 70% at age between 13 and 15 years) and 8.0–10.0 cm (3.1–3.9 in) per year for females (age 11–13) (based on data from white British adolescents who participated in the Harpenden Growth Study). In addition to changes in height, adolescents also experience a significant increase in body mass / weight. The weight gained during adolescence constitutes nearly half of one's adult body weight. Teenage and early adult males may continue to gain natural muscle growth even after puberty.

The accelerated growth in different body parts happens at different times, but for all adolescents, it has a fairly regular sequence. The first places to grow are the extremities—the head, hands and feet—followed by the arms and legs, then the torso and shoulders. This non-uniform growth is one reason why an adolescent body may seem out of proportion.

During puberty, bones become harder and more brittle. At the conclusion of puberty, the ends of the long bones close during the process called epiphysis. There can be ethnic differences in these skeletal changes. For example, in the United States, bone density increases significantly more among black than white adolescents, which might account for decreased likelihood of black women developing osteoporosis and having fewer bone fractures there.

Another set of significant physical changes during puberty happen in bodily distribution of fat and muscle. This process is different for females and males. Before puberty, there are nearly no sex differences in fat and muscle distribution; during puberty, boys grow muscle much faster than girls, although both sexes experience rapid muscle development. In contrast, though both sexes experience an increase in body fat, the increase is much more significant for girls. Frequently, the increase in fat for girls happens in their years just before puberty. The ratio between muscle and fat among post-pubertal boys is around three to one, while for girls it is about five to four. This may help explain sex differences in athletic performance.

Pubertal development also affects circulatory and respiratory systems as an adolescents' heart and lungs increase in both size and capacity. These changes lead to increased strength and tolerance for exercise. Sex differences are apparent as males tend to develop "larger hearts and lungs, higher systolic blood pressure, a lower resting heart rate, a greater capacity for carrying oxygen to the blood, a greater power for neutralizing the chemical products of muscular exercise, higher blood hemoglobin and more red blood cells".

Despite some genetic sex differences, environmental factors play a large role in biological changes during adolescence. For example, girls tend to reduce their physical activity in preadolescence and may receive inadequate nutrition from diets that often lack important nutrients, such as iron. These environmental influences, in turn, affect female physical development.

=== Reproduction-related changes ===
Primary sex characteristics are those directly related to the sex organs. In males, the first stages of puberty involve growth of the testes and scrotum, followed by growth of the penis. At the time that the penis develops, the seminal vesicles, the prostate, and the bulbourethral gland also enlarge and develop. The first ejaculation of seminal fluid generally occurs about one year after the beginning of accelerated penis growth, although this is often determined culturally rather than biologically, since for many boys the first ejaculation occurs as a result of masturbation. Boys are generally fertile before they have an adult appearance.

In females, changes in the primary sex characteristics involve growth of the uterus, vagina, and other aspects of the reproductive system. Menarche, the beginning of menstruation, is a relatively late development which follows a long series of hormonal changes. Generally, a girl is not fully fertile until several years after menarche, as regular ovulation follows menarche by about two years. Unlike males, therefore, females usually appear physically mature before they are capable of becoming pregnant.

Changes in secondary sex characteristics include every change that is not directly related to sexual reproduction. In males, these changes involve appearance of pubic, facial, and body hair, deepening of the voice, roughening of the skin around the upper arms and thighs, and increased development of the sweat glands. In females, secondary sex changes involve elevation of the breasts, widening of the hips, development of pubic and underarm hair, widening of the areolae, and elevation of the nipples. The changes in secondary sex characteristics that take place during puberty are often referred to in terms of five Tanner stages, named after the British pediatrician who devised the categorization system.

=== Changes in the brain ===
The human brain is not finished developing by the time a person reaches puberty, or even finishes it. The frontal lobe of the brain has been known to shape itself well into one's 30s. Neuroscientists often cannot agree precisely on when this developmental period ends or if there is an exact age for the end of brain development. Below the age of about roughly 30, the human brain has been implicated in human behavior and social immaturity. However, there has been no empirical study indicating a causal relationship with the development of the prefrontal cortex in adolescence and into early adulthood with any irrational behaviors. The brain reaches 90% of its adult size by six years of age. Thus, the brain does not grow in size much during adolescence.

It is a common misconception that the human brain matures at around age 25 and is immature before that.

Over the course of adolescence, the amount of white matter in the brain increases linearly, while the amount of grey matter in the brain follows an inverted-U pattern. Through a process called synaptic pruning, unnecessary neuronal connections in the brain are eliminated and the amount of grey matter is pared down. However, this does not mean that the brain loses functionality; rather, it becomes more efficient due to increased myelination (insulation of axons) and the reduction of unused pathways.

The first areas of the brain to be pruned are those involving primary functions, such as motor and sensory areas. The areas of the brain involved in more complex processes lose matter later in development. These include the lateral and prefrontal cortices, among other regions. Some of the most developmentally significant changes in the brain occur in the prefrontal cortex, which is involved in decision making and cognitive control, as well as other higher cognitive functions. During adolescence, myelination and synaptic pruning in the prefrontal cortex increases, improving the efficiency of information processing, and neural connections between the prefrontal cortex and other regions of the brain are strengthened. This leads to better evaluation of risks and rewards, as well as improved control over impulses. Specifically, developments in the dorsolateral prefrontal cortex are important for controlling impulses and planning ahead, while development in the ventromedial prefrontal cortex is important for decision making. Changes in the orbitofrontal cortex are important for evaluating rewards and risks.

Three neurotransmitters that play important roles in adolescent brain development are glutamate, dopamine and serotonin. Glutamate is an excitatory neurotransmitter. During the synaptic pruning that occurs during adolescence, most of the neural connections that are pruned contain receptors for glutamate or other excitatory neurotransmitters. Because of this, by early adulthood the synaptic balance in the brain is more inhibitory than excitatory.

Dopamine is associated with pleasure and attuning to the environment during decision-making. During adolescence, dopamine levels in the limbic system increase and input of dopamine to the prefrontal cortex increases. The balance of excitatory to inhibitory neurotransmitters and increased dopamine activity in adolescence may have implications for adolescent risk-taking and vulnerability to boredom (see Cognitive development below).

Serotonin is a neuromodulator involved in regulation of mood and behavior. Development in the limbic system plays an important role in determining rewards and punishments and processing emotional experience and social information. Changes in the levels of the neurotransmitters dopamine and serotonin in the limbic system make adolescents more emotional and more responsive to rewards and stress. The corresponding increase in emotional variability also can increase adolescents' vulnerability. The effect of serotonin is not limited to the limbic system: Several serotonin receptors have their gene expression change dramatically during adolescence, particularly in the human frontal and prefrontal cortex.

== Cognitive development ==
Adolescence is a time of rapid cognitive development. Piaget describes adolescence as the stage of life in which the individual's thoughts start taking more of an abstract form and the egocentric thoughts decrease, allowing the individual to think and reason in a wider perspective. A combination of behavioural and fMRI studies have demonstrated development of executive functions, that is, cognitive skills that enable the control and coordination of thoughts and behaviour, which are generally associated with the prefrontal cortex. The thoughts, ideas and concepts developed at this period of life greatly influence one's future life, playing a major role in character and personality formation.

Biological changes in brain structure and connectivity within the brain interact with increased experience, knowledge, and changing social demands to produce rapid cognitive growth (see Changes in the brain above). The age at which particular changes take place varies between individuals, but the changes discussed below begin at puberty or shortly after that and some skills continue to develop as the adolescent ages. The dual systems model proposes a maturational imbalance between development of the socioemotional system and cognitive control systems in the brain that contribute to impulsivity and other behaviors characteristic of adolescence. Some studies like the ABCD Study are researching on the baseline of adolescent cognitive development.

=== Theoretical perspectives ===
There are at least two major approaches to understanding cognitive change during adolescence. One is the constructivist view of cognitive development. Based on the work of Piaget, it takes a quantitative, state-theory approach, hypothesizing that adolescents' cognitive improvement is relatively sudden and drastic. The second is the information-processing perspective, which derives from the study of artificial intelligence and attempts to explain cognitive development in terms of the growth of specific components of the thinking process.

=== Improvements in cognitive ability ===
By the time individuals have reached ages 12–15 or so their critical thinking and decision-making competency are comparable to those of adults. These improvements occur in five areas during adolescence:

1. Attention: Improvements are seen in selective attention, the process by which one focuses on one stimulus while tuning out another. Divided attention, the ability to pay attention to two or more stimuli at the same time, also improves.
2. Memory: Improvements are seen in both working memory and long-term memory.
3. Processing speed: Adolescents think more quickly than children. Processing speed improves sharply between age five and middle adolescence; it then begins to level off at age 14/15 and does not appear to change between late adolescence and adulthood.
4. Organization: Adolescents are more aware of their thought processes and can use mnemonic devices and other strategies to think more efficiently.
5. Metacognition: Improved knowledge of their own thinking patterns increase self-control and social insight.

Studies newer than 2005 indicate that the brain is changing in efficiency well past its twenties, a 'point of maturity' in the twenties is somewhat arbitrary as many important parts of the brain are noted to be mature by 14 or 15, making 'maturity' hard to define and has often been disagreed with.

Prefrontal cortex pruning has been recorded to level off by age 14 or 15, and has been seen to continue as late as into the sixth decade of life. White matter is recorded to increase up until around the age of 45, and then it is lost via progressive aging.

=== Hypothetical and abstract thinking ===
Adolescents' thinking is less bound to concrete events than that of children: they can contemplate possibilities outside the realm of what currently exists. One manifestation of the adolescent's increased facility with thinking about possibilities is the improvement of skill in deductive reasoning, which leads to the development of hypothetical thinking. This provides the ability to plan ahead, see the future consequences of an action and to provide alternative explanations of events. It also makes adolescents more skilled debaters, as they can reason against a friend's or parent's assumptions. Adolescents also develop a more sophisticated understanding of probability.

The appearance of more systematic, abstract thinking is another notable aspect of cognitive development during adolescence. For example, adolescents find it easier than children to comprehend the sorts of higher-order abstract logic inherent in puns, proverbs, metaphors, and analogies. Their increased facility permits them to appreciate the ways in which language can be used to convey multiple messages, such as satire, metaphor, and sarcasm. (Children younger than age nine often cannot comprehend sarcasm at all.) This also permits the application of advanced reasoning and logical processes to social and ideological matters such as interpersonal relationships, politics, philosophy, religion, morality, friendship, faith, fairness, and honesty.

=== Metacognition ===
A third gain in cognitive ability involves thinking about thinking itself, a process referred to as metacognition. It often involves monitoring one's own cognitive activity during the thinking process. Adolescents' improvements in knowledge of their own thinking patterns lead to better self-control and more effective studying. It is also relevant in social cognition, resulting in increased introspection, self-consciousness, and intellectualization (in the sense of thought about one's own thoughts, rather than the Freudian definition as a defense mechanism). Adolescents are much better able than children to understand that people do not have complete control over their mental activity. Being able to introspect may lead to two forms of adolescent egocentrism, which results in two distinct problems in thinking: the imaginary audience and the personal fable. These likely peak at age fifteen, along with self-consciousness in general.

Related to metacognition and abstract thought, perspective-taking involves a more sophisticated theory of mind. Adolescents reach a stage of social perspective-taking in which they can understand how the thoughts or actions of one person can influence those of another person, even if they personally are not involved.

=== Relativistic thinking ===
Compared to children, adolescents are more likely to question others' assertions, and less likely to accept facts as absolute truths. Through experience outside the family circle, they learn that rules they were taught as absolute are in fact relativistic. They begin to differentiate between rules instituted out of common sense—not touching a hot stove—and those that are based on culturally relative standards (codes of etiquette, not dating until a certain age), a delineation that younger children do not make. This can lead to a period of questioning authority in all domains.

=== Risk-taking ===
Because most injuries sustained by adolescents are related to risky behavior (alcohol consumption and drug use, reckless or distracted driving, unprotected sex), a great deal of research has been done on the cognitive and emotional processes underlying adolescent risk-taking. In addressing this question, it is important to distinguish whether adolescents are more likely to engage in risky behaviors (prevalence), whether they make risk-related decisions similarly or differently than adults (cognitive processing perspective), or whether they use the same processes but value different things and thus arrive at different conclusions.

The behavioral decision-making theory proposes that adolescents and adults both weigh the potential rewards and consequences of an action. However, research has shown that adolescents seem to give more weight to rewards, particularly social rewards, than do adults.

Research seems to favor the hypothesis that adolescents and adults think about risk in similar ways, but hold different values and thus come to different conclusions. Some have argued that there may be evolutionary benefits to an increased propensity for risk-taking in adolescence. For example, without a willingness to take risks, teenagers would not have the motivation or confidence necessary to leave their family of origin. In addition, from a population perspective, there is an advantage to having a group of individuals willing to take more risks and try new methods, counterbalancing the more conservative elements more typical of the received knowledge held by older adults.

Risk-taking may also have reproductive advantages: adolescents have a newfound priority in sexual attraction and dating, and risk-taking is required to impress potential mates. Research also indicates that baseline sensation seeking may affect risk-taking behavior throughout the lifespan. Given the potential consequences, engaging in sexual behavior is somewhat risky, particularly for adolescents. Having unprotected sex, using poor birth control methods (e.g., withdrawal), having multiple sexual partners, and poor communication are some aspects of sexual behavior that increase individual or social risk.

Aspects of adolescents' lives that are correlated with risky sexual behavior include higher rates of parental abuse, and lower rates of parental support and monitoring.

=== Inhibition ===
Related to their increased tendency for risk-taking, adolescents show impaired behavioral inhibition, including deficits in extinction learning. This has important implications for engaging in risky behavior such as unsafe sex or illicit drug use, as adolescents are less likely to inhibit actions that may have negative outcomes in the future. This phenomenon also has consequences for behavioral treatments based on the principle of extinction, such as cue exposure therapy for anxiety or drug addiction. It has been suggested that impaired inhibition, specifically extinction, may help to explain adolescent propensity to relapse to drug-seeking even following behavioral treatment for addiction.

== Psychological development ==
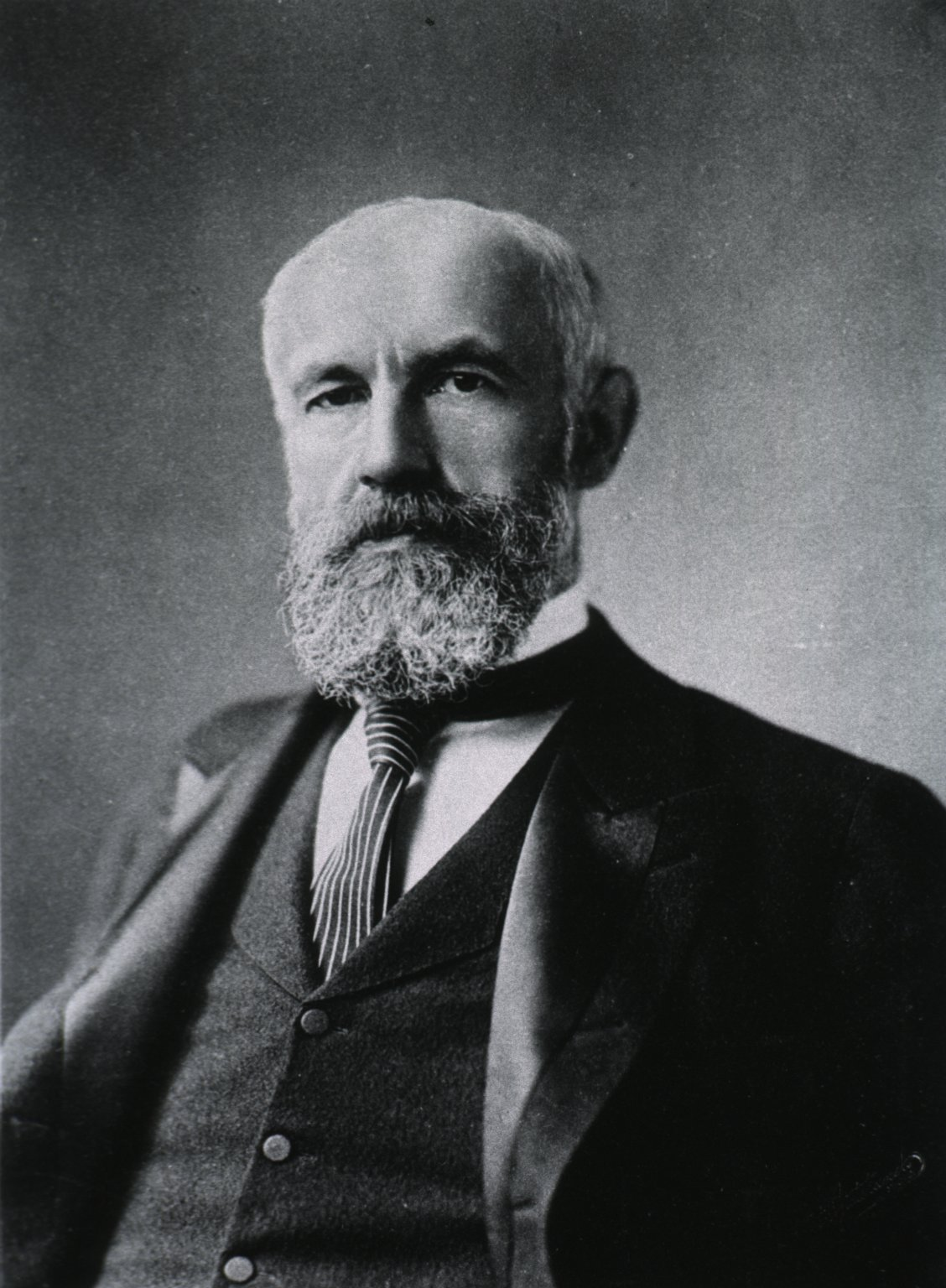
G. Stanley Hall

The formal study of adolescent psychology began with the publication of G. Stanley Hall's Adolescence in 1904. Hall, who was the first president of the American Psychological Association, defined adolescence to be the period of life from ages 14 to 24, and viewed it primarily as a time of internal turmoil and upheaval (sturm und drang). This understanding of youth was based on two then-new ways of understanding human behavior: Darwin's evolutionary theory and Freud's psychodynamic theory. He believed that adolescence was a representation of our human ancestors' phylogenetic shift from being primitive to being civilized. Hall's assertions stood relatively uncontested until the 1950s when psychologists such as Erik Erikson and Anna Freud started to formulate their theories about adolescence. Freud believed that the psychological disturbances associated with youth were biologically based and culturally universal while Erikson focused on the dichotomy between identity formation and role fulfillment. Even with their different theories, these three psychologists agreed that adolescence was inherently a time of disturbance and psychological confusion. The less turbulent aspects of adolescence, such as peer relations and cultural influence, were left largely ignored until the 1980s. From the '50s until the '80s, the focus of the field was mainly on describing patterns of behavior as opposed to explaining them.

Jean Macfarlane founded the University of California, Berkeley's Institute of Human Development, formerly called the Institute of Child Welfare, in 1927. The institute was instrumental in initiating studies of healthy development, in contrast to previous work that had been dominated by theories based on pathological personalities. The studies looked at human development during the Great Depression and World War II, unique historical circumstances under which a generation of children grew up. The Oakland Growth Study, initiated by Harold Jones and Herbert Stolz in 1931, aimed to study the physical, intellectual, and social development of children in the Oakland area. Data collection began in 1932 and continued until 1981, allowing the researchers to gather longitudinal data on the individuals that extended past adolescence into adulthood. Jean Macfarlane launched the Berkeley Guidance Study, which examined the development of children in terms of their socioeconomic and family backgrounds. These studies provided the background for Glen Elder in the 1960s to propose a life course perspective of adolescent development. Elder formulated several descriptive principles of adolescent development. The principle of historical time and place states that an individual's development is shaped by the period and location in which they grow up. The principle of the importance of timing in one's life refers to the different impact that life events have on development based on when in one's life they occur. The idea of linked lives states that one's development is shaped by the interconnected network of relationships of which one is a part and the principle of human agency asserts that one's life course is constructed via the choices and actions of an individual within the context of their historical period and social network.

In 1984, the Society for Research on Adolescence (SRA) became the first official organization dedicated to the study of adolescent psychology. Some of the issues first addressed by this group include: the nature versus nurture debate as it pertains to adolescence; understanding the interactions between adolescents and their environment; and considering culture, social groups, and historical context when interpreting adolescent behavior.

Evolutionary biologists like Jeremy Griffith have drawn parallels between adolescent psychology and the developmental evolution of modern humans from hominid ancestors as a manifestation of how "ontogeny recapitulates phylogeny".

== Social development ==
=== Identity development ===
Identity development is a stage in the adolescent life cycle. For most, the search for identity begins in the adolescent years. During these years, adolescents are more open to "'try[ing] on' different appearances and behaviors" to discover who they are. In an attempt to find their identity and discover who they are, adolescents are likely to cycle through a number of identities to find one that suits them best. Developing and maintaining identity (in adolescent years) is a difficult task due to multiple factors such as family life, environment, and social status. Empirical studies suggest that this process might be more accurately described as identity development, rather than formation, but confirms a normative process of change in both content and structure of one's thoughts about the self. The two main aspects of identity development are self-clarity and self-esteem. Since choices made during adolescent years can influence later life, high levels of self-awareness and self-control during mid-adolescence will lead to better decisions during the transition to adulthood. Researchers have used three general approaches to understanding identity development: self-concept, sense of identity, and self-esteem. The years of adolescence create a more conscientious group of young adults. Adolescents pay close attention and give more time and effort to their appearance as their body goes through changes. Unlike children, teens put forth an effort to look presentable. The environment in which an adolescent grows up also plays an important role in their identity development. Studies done by the American Psychological Association have shown that adolescents with a less privileged upbringing have a more difficult time developing their identity.

==== Self-concept ====
The idea of self-concept is known as the ability of a person to have opinions and beliefs that are defined confidently, consistent and stable. Early in adolescence, cognitive developments result in greater self-awareness, greater awareness of others and their thoughts and judgments, the ability to think about abstract, future possibilities, and the ability to consider multiple possibilities at once. As a result, adolescents experience a significant shift from the simple, concrete, and global self-descriptions typical of young children; as children, they defined themselves solely by physical traits whereas adolescents additionally define themselves based on their values, thoughts, and opinions.

Adolescents can conceptualize multiple "possible selves" that they could become and long-term possibilities and consequences of their choices. Exploring these possibilities may result in abrupt changes in self-presentation as the adolescent chooses or rejects qualities and behaviors, trying to guide the actual self toward the ideal self (who the adolescent wishes to be) and away from the feared self (who the adolescent does not want to be). For many, these distinctions are uncomfortable, but they also appear to motivate achievement through behavior consistent with the ideal and distinct from the feared possible selves.

Further distinctions in self-concept, called "differentiation," occur as the adolescent recognizes the contextual influences on their own behavior and the perceptions of others, and begin to qualify their traits when asked to describe themselves. Differentiation appears fully developed by mid-adolescence. Peaking in the 7th-9th grades, the personality traits adolescents use to describe themselves refer to specific contexts, and therefore may contradict one another. The recognition of inconsistent content in the self-concept is a common source of distress in these years (see Cognitive dissonance), but this distress may benefit adolescents by encouraging structural development.

==== Sense of identity ====
Egocentrism in adolescents forms a self-conscious desire to feel important in their peer groups and enjoy social acceptance. Unlike the conflicting aspects of self-concept, identity represents a coherent sense of self stable across circumstances and including past experiences and future goals. Everyone has a self-concept, whereas Erik Erikson argued that not everyone fully achieves identity. Erikson's theory of stages of development includes the identity crisis in which adolescents must explore different possibilities and integrate different parts of themselves before committing to their beliefs. He described the resolution of this process as a stage of "identity achievement" but also stressed that the identity challenge "is never fully resolved once and for all at one point in time". Adolescents begin by defining themselves based on their crowd membership. "Clothes help teens explore new identities, separate from parents, and bond with peers." Fashion plays a major role when it comes to teenagers finding themselves; fashion is always evolving, which corresponds with the evolution of change in the personality of teenagers. Adolescents attempt to define their identity by consciously styling themselves in different manners to find what best suits them. Trial and error in matching both their perceived image and the image others respond to and see, allows for the adolescent to grasp an understanding of who they are.

Just as fashion is evolving to influence adolescents, so is the media. "Modern life takes place amidst a never-ending barrage of flesh on screens, pages, and billboards." This barrage consciously or subconsciously registers into the mind causing issues with self-image a factor that contributes to an adolescence sense of identity. Researcher James Marcia developed the current method for testing an individual's progress along these stages. His questions are divided into three categories: occupation, ideology, and interpersonal relationships. Answers are scored based on the extent to which the individual has explored and the degree to which he has made commitments. The result is classification of the individual into a) identity diffusion in which all children begin, b) Identity Foreclosure in which commitments are made without the exploration of alternatives, c) Moratorium, or the process of exploration, or d) Identity Achievement in which Moratorium has occurred and resulted in commitments.

Research since reveals self-examination beginning early in adolescence, but identity achievement rarely occurring before age 18. The freshman year of college influences identity development significantly, but may actually prolong psychosocial moratorium by encouraging reexamination of previous commitments and further exploration of alternate possibilities without encouraging resolution. For the most part, evidence has supported Erikson's stages: each correlates with the personality traits he originally predicted. Studies also confirm the impermanence of the stages; there is no final endpoint in identity development.

==== Environment and identity ====
An adolescent's environment plays a huge role in their identity development. While most adolescent studies are conducted on white, middle class children, studies show that the more privileged upbringing people have, the more successfully they develop their identity. The forming of an adolescent's identity is a crucial time in their life. It has been recently found that demographic patterns suggest that the transition to adulthood is now occurring over a longer span of years than was the case during the middle of the 20th century. Accordingly, youth, a period that spans late adolescence and early adulthood, has become a more prominent stage of the life course. This, therefore, has caused various factors to become important during this development. Many factors contribute to the developing social identity of an adolescent from commitment, to coping devices, to social media. All of these factors are affected by the environment an adolescent grows up in. A child from a more privileged upbringing is exposed to more opportunities and better situations in general. An adolescent from an inner city or a crime-driven neighborhood is more likely to be exposed to an environment that can be detrimental to their development. Children that grow up in comparatively stable or affluent suburban communities tend to have more access to activities that can contribute to a more successful identity development.

==== Sexual orientation and identity ====
Sexual orientation has been defined as "an erotic inclination toward people of one or more genders, most often described as sexual or erotic attractions". In recent years, psychologists have sought to understand how sexual orientation develops during adolescence. Some theorists believe that there are many different possible developmental paths one could take, and that the specific path an individual follows may be determined by their sex, orientation, and when they reached the onset of puberty.

In 1989, Troiden proposed a four-stage model for the development of homosexual sexual identity. The first stage, known as sensitization, usually starts in childhood, and is marked by the child's becoming aware of same-sex attractions. The second stage, identity confusion, tends to occur a few years later. In this stage, the youth is overwhelmed by feelings of inner turmoil regarding their sexual orientation, and begins to engage in sexual experiences with same-sex partners. In the third stage of identity assumption, which usually takes place a few years after the adolescent has left home, adolescents begin to come out to their family and close friends, and assumes a self-definition as gay, lesbian, or bisexual. In the final stage, known as commitment, the young adult adopts their sexual identity as a lifestyle. Therefore, this model estimates that the process of coming out begins in childhood, and continues through the early to mid 20s. This model has been contested, and alternate ideas have been explored in recent years.

In terms of sexual identity, adolescence is when most gay/lesbian and transgender adolescents begin to recognize and make sense of their feelings. Many adolescents may choose to come out during this period of their life once an identity has been formed; many others may go through a period of questioning or denial, which can include experimentation with both homosexual and heterosexual experiences. A study of 194 lesbian, gay, and bisexual youths under the age of 21 found that having an awareness of one's sexual orientation occurred, on average, around age 10, but the process of coming out to peers and adults occurred around age 16 and 17, respectively. Coming to terms with and creating a positive LGBT identity can be difficult for some youth for a variety of reasons. Peer pressure is a large factor when youth who are questioning their sexuality or gender identity are surrounded by heteronormative peers and can cause great distress due to a feeling of being different from everyone else. While coming out can also foster better psychological adjustment, the risks associated are real. Indeed, coming out in the midst of a heteronormative peer environment often comes with the risk of ostracism, hurtful jokes, and even violence. Because of this, statistically the suicide rate amongst LGBT adolescents is up to four times higher than that of their heterosexual peers due to bullying and rejection from peers or family members.

==== Self-esteem ====
The final major aspect of identity formation is self-esteem. Self-esteem is defined as one's thoughts and feelings about one's self-concept and identity. Most theories on self-esteem state that there is a grand desire, across all genders and ages, to maintain, protect and enhance their self-esteem. Contrary to popular belief, there is no empirical evidence for a significant drop in self-esteem over the course of adolescence. "Barometric self-esteem" fluctuates rapidly and can cause severe distress and anxiety, but baseline self-esteem remains highly stable across adolescence. The validity of global self-esteem scales has been questioned, and many suggest that more specific scales might reveal more about the adolescent experience. Girls are most likely to enjoy high self-esteem when engaged in supportive relationships with friends, the most important function of friendship to them is having someone who can provide social and moral support. Girls suffer from low self-esteem when they fail to win friends' approval or cannot find someone with whom to share common activities and common interests. In contrast, boys are more concerned with establishing and asserting their independence and defining their relation to authority. As such, they are more likely to derive high self-esteem from their ability to successfully influence their friends; on the other hand, the lack of romantic competence, for example failure to win or maintain the affection of the gender(s) they are attracted to, is the major contributor to low self-esteem in adolescent boys. Due to the fact that both men and women happen to have a low self-esteem after ending a romantic relationship, they are prone to other symptoms that is caused by this state. Depression and hopelessness are only two of the various symptoms and it is said that women are twice as likely to experience depression and men are three to four times more likely to commit suicide.

=== Relationships ===
==== In general ====
The relationships adolescents have with their peers, family, and members of their social sphere play a vital role in the social development of an adolescent. As an adolescent's social sphere develops rapidly as they distinguish the differences between friends and acquaintances, they often become heavily emotionally invested in friends. This is not harmful; however, if these friends expose an individual to potentially harmful situations, this is an aspect of peer pressure. Adolescence is a critical period in social development because adolescents can be easily influenced by the people they develop close relationships with. This is the first time individuals can truly make their own decisions, which also makes this a sensitive period. Relationships are vital in the social development of an adolescent due to the extreme influence peers can have over an individual.

These relationships become significant because they begin to help the adolescent understand the concept of personalities, how they form, and why a person has that specific type of personality. "The use of psychological comparisons could serve both as an index of the growth of an implicit personality theory and as a component process accounting for its creation. In other words, by comparing one person's personality characteristics to another's, we would be setting up the framework for creating a general theory of personality (and, ... such a theory would serve as a useful framework for coming to understand specific persons)." This can be likened to the use of social comparison in developing one's identity and self-concept, which includes one's personality, and underscores the importance of communication, and thus relationships, in one's development. In social comparison, we use reference groups, with respect to both psychological and identity development. These reference groups are the peers of adolescents. This means that who the teen chooses/accepts as their friends and who they communicate with on a frequent basis often makes up their reference groups and can therefore have a huge impact on who they become. Research shows that relationships have the largest affect over the social development of an individual.

==== Family ====
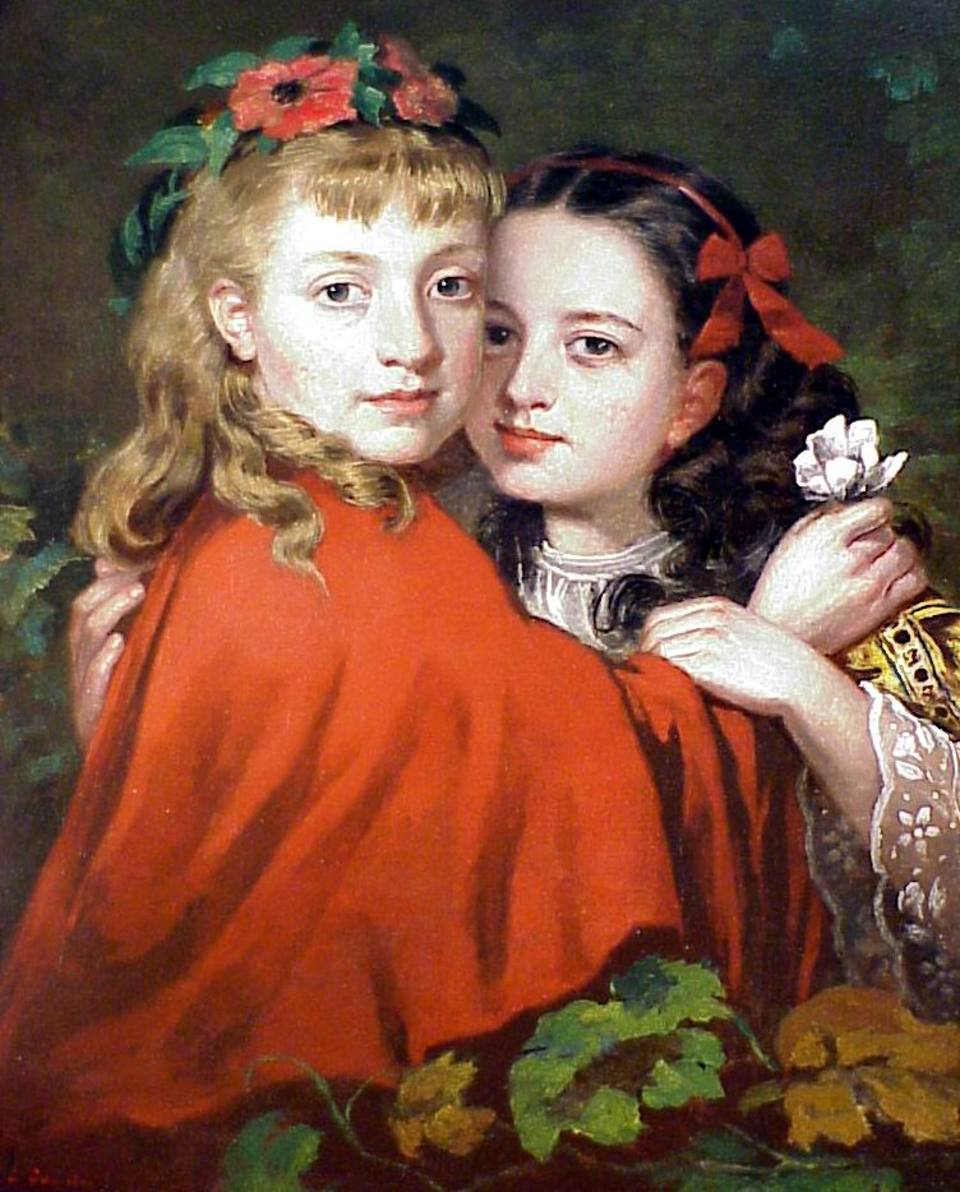
The Sisters, by James Collinson

Adolescence marks a rapid change in one's role within a family. Young children tend to assert themselves forcefully, but are unable to demonstrate much influence over family decisions until early adolescence, when they are increasingly viewed by parents as equals. The adolescent faces the task of increasing independence while preserving a caring relationship with their parents. When children go through puberty, there is often a significant increase in parent–child conflict and a less cohesive familial bond. Arguments often concern minor issues of control, such as curfew, acceptable clothing, and the adolescent's right to privacy, which adolescents may have previously viewed as issues over which their parents had complete authority. Parent–adolescent disagreement also increases as friends demonstrate a greater impact on one another, introducing new influences on the adolescent that may be in opposition to parents' values.

Social media has also played an increasing role in adolescent and parent disagreements. While parents never had to worry about the threats of social media in the past, it has become a dangerous place for children. While adolescents strive for their freedoms, the unknowns to parents of what their child is doing on social media sites is a challenging subject, due to the increasing amount of predators on social media sites. Many parents have very little knowledge of social networking sites in the first place and this further increases their mistrust. An important challenge for the parent–adolescent relationship is to understand how to enhance the opportunities of online communication while managing its risks. Although conflicts between children and parents increase during adolescence, these are just relatively minor issues. Regarding their important life issues, most adolescents still share the same attitudes and values as their parents.

During childhood, siblings are a source of conflict and frustration as well as a support system. Adolescence may affect this relationship differently, depending on the sibling's gender. In same-sex sibling pairs, intimacy increases during early adolescence, then remains stable. Mixed-sex siblings pairs act differently; siblings drift apart during early adolescent years, but experience an increase in intimacy starting at middle adolescence. Sibling interactions are children's first relational experiences, the ones that shape their social and self-understanding for life. Sustaining positive sibling relations can assist adolescents in a number of ways. Siblings are able to act as peers, and may increase one another's sociability and feelings of self-worth. Older siblings can give guidance to younger siblings, although the impact of this can be either positive or negative depending on the activity of the older sibling.

A potential important influence on adolescence is change of the family dynamic, specifically divorce. With the divorce rate up to about 50%, divorce is common and adds to the already great amount of change in adolescence. Custody disputes soon after a divorce often reflect a playing out of control battles and ambivalence between parents. Divorce usually results in less contact between the adolescent and their noncustodial parent. In extreme cases of instability and abuse in homes, divorce can have a positive effect on families due to less conflict in the home. However, most research suggests a negative effect on adolescence as well as later development. A recent study found that, compared with peers who grow up in stable post-divorce families, children of divorce who experience additional family transitions during late adolescence make less progress in their math and social studies performance over time. Another recent study put forth a new theory, entitled the adolescent epistemological trauma theory, which posited that traumatic life events, such as parental divorce, during the formative period of late adolescence portend lifelong effects on adult conflict behavior that can be mitigated by effective behavioral assessment and training. A parental divorce during childhood or adolescence continues to have a negative effect when a person is in their twenties and early thirties. These negative effects include romantic relationships and conflict style, meaning that, as adults, they are more likely to use the styles of avoidance and competing in conflict management.

Despite changing family roles during adolescence, the home environment and parents are still important for the behaviors and choices of adolescents. Adolescents who have a good relationship with their parents are less likely to engage in various risky behaviors, such as smoking, drinking, fighting, or unprotected sexual intercourse. In addition, parents influence the education of adolescence. A study conducted by Adalbjarnardottir and Blondal in 2009 showed that adolescents at the age of 14 who identify their parents as authoritative figures are more likely to complete secondary education by the age of 22, as support and encouragement from an authoritative parent motivates the adolescence to complete schooling to avoid disappointing that parent.

==== Peers ====
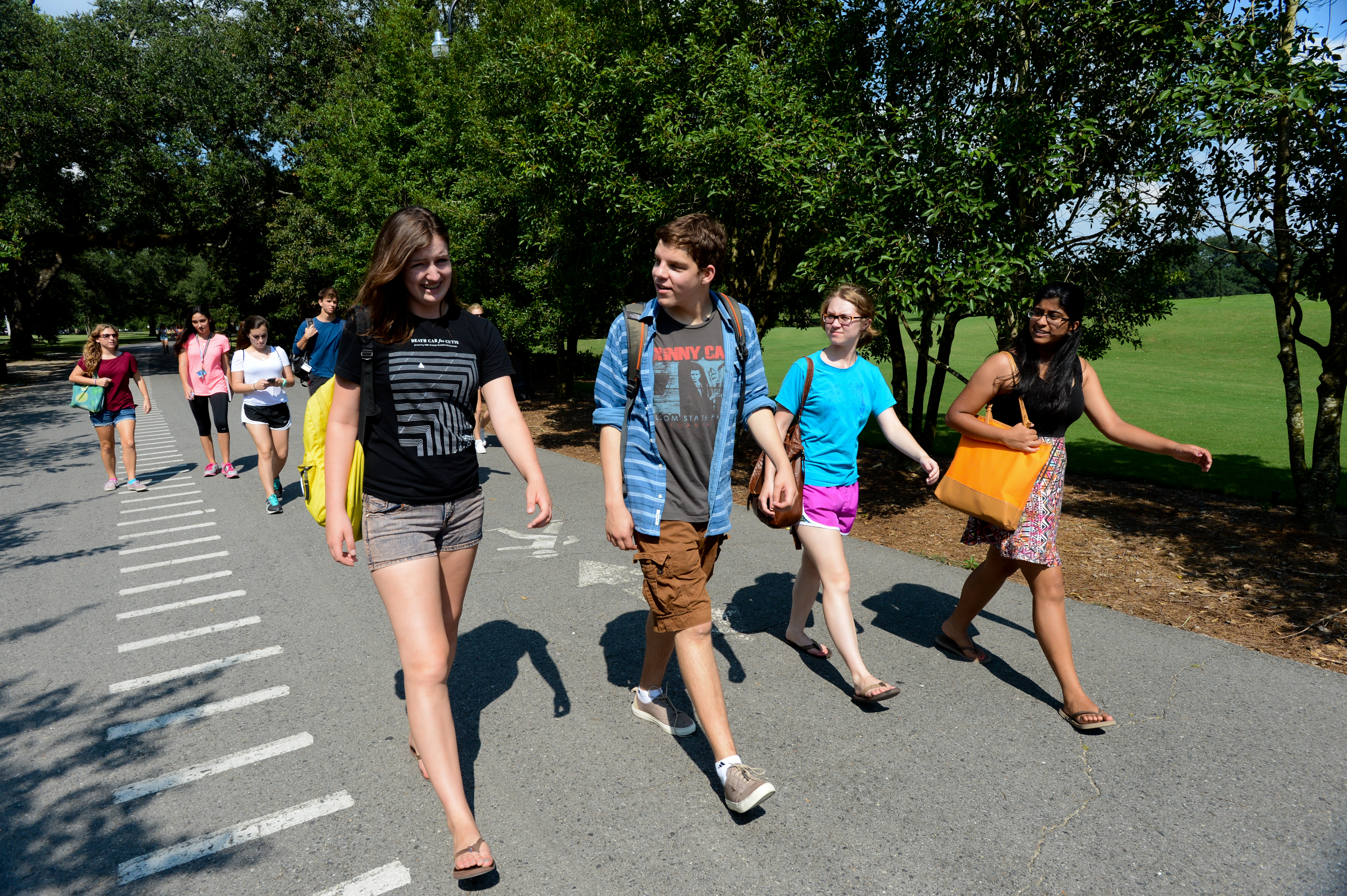
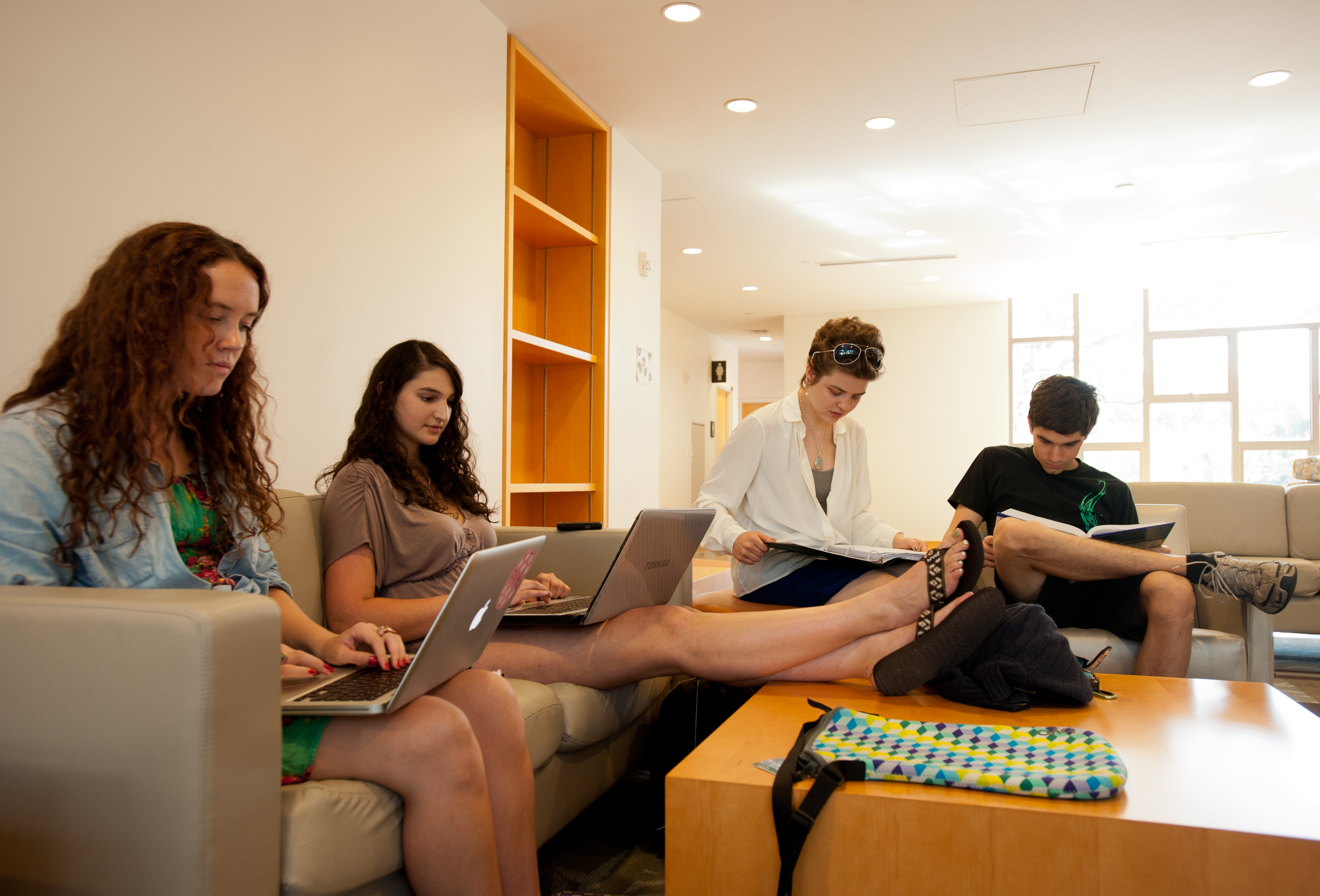
Top: Students of a U.S. university do an outdoor class, where they discuss topics while walking. Bottom: Students study in a U.S. university library, using books and laptops.

Peer groups are essential to social and general development. Communication with peers increases significantly during adolescence and peer relationships become more intense than in other stages and more influential to the teen, affecting both their decisions and choices. High-quality friendships may enhance children's development regardless of the characteristics of those friends. As children begin to bond with various people and create friendships, it later helps them when they are adolescent and sets up the framework for adolescence and peer groups. Peer groups are especially important during adolescence, a period of development characterized by a dramatic increase in time spent with peers and a decrease in adult supervision. Adolescents also associate with friends of the opposite sex much more than in childhood and tend to identify with larger groups of peers based on shared characteristics. It is also common for adolescents to use friends as coping devices in different situations. A three-factor structure of dealing with friends including avoidance, mastery, and nonchalance has shown that adolescents use friends as coping devices with social stresses.

Communication within peer groups allows adolescents to explore their feelings and identity as well as develop and evaluate their social skills. Peer groups offer members the opportunity to develop social skills such as empathy, sharing, and leadership. Adolescents choose peer groups based on characteristics similarly found in themselves. By utilizing these relationships, adolescents become more accepting of who they are becoming. Group norms and values are incorporated into an adolescent's own self-concept. Through developing new communication skills and reflecting upon those of their peers, as well as self-opinions and values, an adolescent can share and express emotions and other concerns without fear of rejection or judgment. Peer groups can have positive influences on an individual, such as on academic motivation and performance. However, while peers may facilitate social development for one another, they may also hinder it. Peers can have negative influences, such as encouraging experimentation with drugs, drinking, vandalism, and stealing through peer pressure. Susceptibility to peer pressure increases during early adolescence, peaks around age 14, and declines thereafter. Further evidence of peers hindering social development has been found in Spanish teenagers, where emotional (rather than solution-based) reactions to problems and emotional instability have been linked with physical aggression against peers. Both physical and relational aggression are linked to a vast number of enduring psychological difficulties, especially depression, as is social rejection. Because of this, bullied adolescents often develop problems that lead to further victimization. Bullied adolescents are more likely to both continue to be bullied and to bully others in the future. However, this relationship is less stable in cases of cyberbullying, a relatively new issue among adolescents.

Adolescents tend to associate with "cliques" on a small scale and "crowds" on a larger scale. During early adolescence, adolescents often associate in cliques, exclusive, single-sex groups of peers with whom they are particularly close which may help adolescents become socially acclimated and form a stronger sense of identity. Within a clique of highly athletic male peers, for example, the clique may create a stronger sense of fidelity and competition. Cliques also have become somewhat a "collective parent", i.e. telling the adolescents what to do and not to do. Towards late adolescence, cliques often merge into mixed-sex groups as teenagers begin romantically engaging with one another. These small friend groups then break down further as socialization becomes more couple-oriented.

On a larger scale, adolescents often associate with crowds, groups of individuals who share a common interest or activity. Often, crowd identities may be the basis for stereotyping young people, such as jocks or nerds. In large, multi-ethnic high schools, there are often ethnically determined crowds. While crowds are very influential during early and middle adolescence, they lose salience during high school as students identify more individually.

An important aspect of communication is the channel used. Channel, in this respect, refers to the form of communication, be it face-to-face, email, text message, phone or other. Teens are heavy users of newer forms of communication such as text message and social-networking websites such as Facebook, especially when communicating with peers. Adolescents use online technology to experiment with emerging identities and to broaden their peer groups, such as increasing the amount of friends acquired on Facebook and other social media sites. Some adolescents use these newer channels to enhance relationships with peers however there can be negative uses as well such as cyberbullying, as mentioned previously, and negative impacts on the family.

==== Romance and sexual activity ====
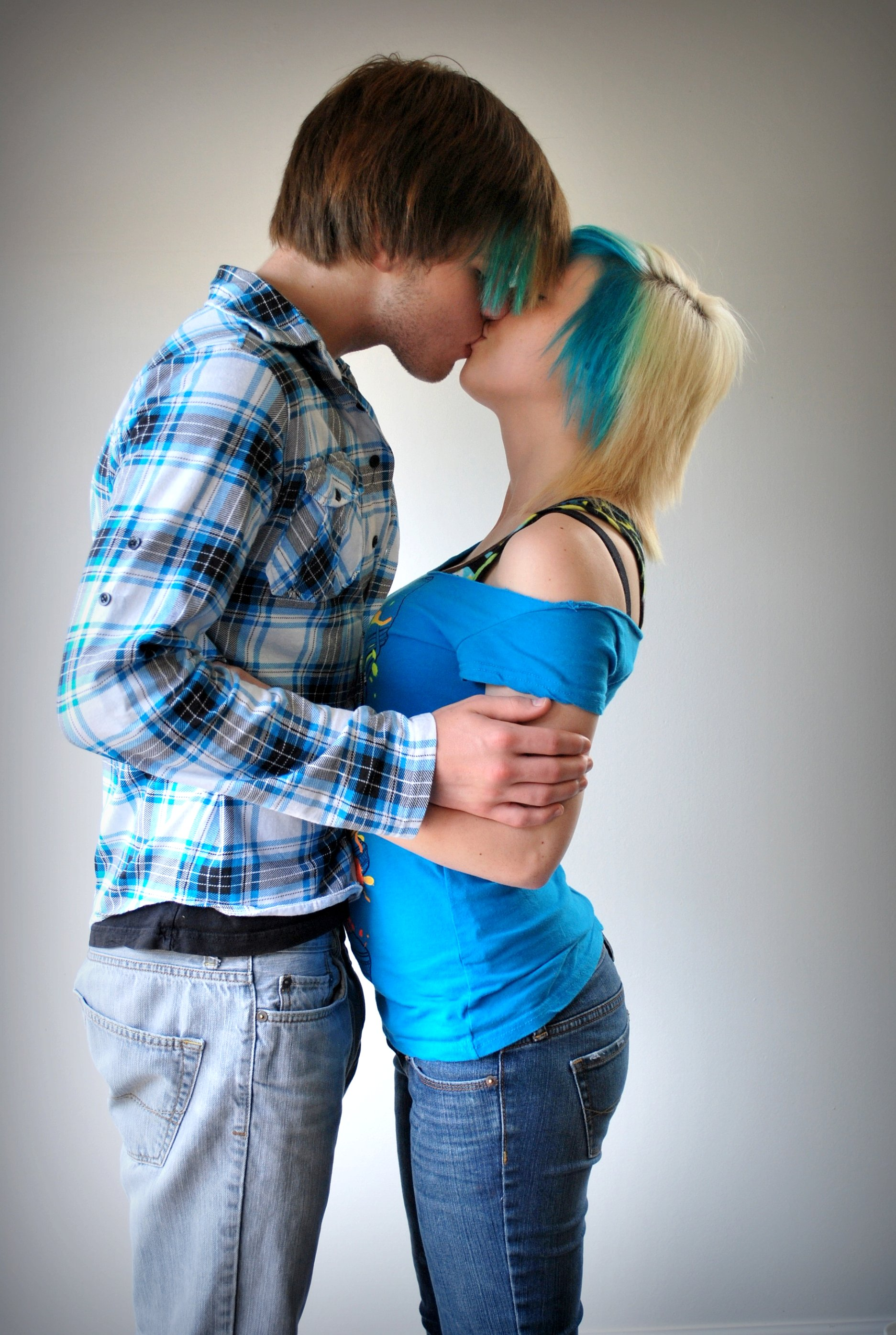
Adolescent couple kissing

Romantic relationships tend to increase in prevalence throughout adolescence. By age 15, 53% of adolescents have had a romantic relationship that lasted at least one month over the course of the previous 18 months. In a 2008 study conducted by YouGov for Channel 4, 20% of 14−17-year-olds surveyed revealed that they had their first sexual experience at 13 or under in the United Kingdom. A 2002 American study found that those aged 15–44 reported that the average age of first sexual intercourse was 17.0 for males and 17.3 for females. The typical duration of relationships increases throughout the teenage years as well. This constant increase in the likelihood of a long-term relationship can be explained by sexual maturation and the development of cognitive skills necessary to maintain a romantic bond (e.g., caregiving, appropriate attachment), although these skills are not strongly developed until late adolescence. Long-term relationships allow adolescents to gain the skills necessary for high-quality relationships later in life and develop feelings of self-worth. Overall, positive romantic relationships among adolescents can result in long-term benefits. High-quality romantic relationships are associated with higher commitment in early adulthood and are positively associated with self-esteem, self-confidence, and social competence. For example, an adolescent with positive self-confidence is likely to consider themselves a more successful partner, whereas negative experiences may lead to low confidence as a romantic partner. Adolescents often date within their demographic in regards to race, ethnicity, popularity, and physical attractiveness. However, there are traits in which certain individuals, particularly adolescent girls, seek diversity. While most adolescents date people approximately their own age, boys typically date partners the same age or younger; girls typically date partners the same age or older.

Some researchers are now focusing on learning about how adolescents view their own relationships and sexuality; they want to move away from a research point of view that focuses on the problems associated with adolescent sexuality. College Professor Lucia O'Sullivan and her colleagues found that there were no significant gender differences in the relationship events adolescent boys and girls from grades 7–12 reported. Most teens said they had kissed their partners, held hands with them, thought of themselves as being a couple, and told people they were in a relationship. This means that private thoughts about the relationship as well as public recognition of the relationship were both important to the adolescents in the sample. Sexual events (such as sexual touching and sexual intercourse) were less common than romantic events (holding hands) and social events (being with one's partner in a group setting). The researchers state that these results are important because the results focus on the more positive aspects of adolescents and their social and romantic interactions rather than focusing on sexual behavior and its consequences.

Adolescence marks a time of sexual maturation, which manifests in social interactions as well. While adolescents may engage in casual sexual encounters (often referred to as hookups), most sexual experience during this period of development takes place within romantic relationships. Adolescents can use technologies and social media to seek out romantic relationships, as they feel it is a safe place to try out dating and identity exploration. From these social media encounters, a further relationship may begin. Among young adolescents, "heavy" sexual activity, marked by genital stimulation, is often associated with violence, depression, and poor relationship quality. This effect does not hold true for sexual activity in late adolescence that takes place within a romantic relationship. Some research suggest that there are genetic causes of early sexual activity that are also risk factors for delinquency, suggesting that there is a group who are at risk for both early sexual activity and emotional distress. For older adolescents, though, sexual activity in the context of romantic relationships was actually correlated with lower levels of deviant behavior after controlling for genetic risks, as opposed to sex outside of a relationship (hook-ups).

Dating violence can occur within adolescent relationships. When surveyed, 12–25% of adolescents reported having experienced physical violence in the context of a relationship while a quarter to a third of adolescents reported having experiencing psychological aggression. This reported aggression includes hitting, throwing things, or slaps, although most of this physical aggression does not result in a medical visit. Physical aggression in relationships tends to decline from high school through college and young adulthood. In heterosexual couples, there is no significant difference between the rates of male and female aggressors, unlike in adult relationships.

Female adolescents from minority populations are at increased risk for intimate partner violence (IPV). Recent research findings suggest that a substantial portion of young urban females are at high risk for being victims of multiple forms of IPV. Practitioners diagnosing depression among urban minority teens should assess for both physical and non-physical forms of IPV, and early detection can help to identify youths in need of intervention and care. Similarly to adult victims, adolescent victims do not readily disclose abuse, and may seek out medical care for problems not directly related to incidences of IPV. Therefore, screening should be a routine part of medical treatment for adolescents regardless of chief complaint. Many adults discount instances of IPV in adolescents or believe they do not occur because relationships at young ages are viewed as "puppy love," however, it is crucial that adults take IPV in adolescents seriously even though often policy falls behind.

In contemporary society, adolescents also face some risks as their sexuality begins to transform. While some of these, such as emotional distress (fear of abuse or exploitation) and sexually transmitted infections/diseases (STIs/STDs), including HIV/AIDS, are not necessarily inherent to adolescence, others, such as teenage pregnancy (through non-use or failure of contraceptives), are seen as social problems in most western societies. One in four sexually active teenagers will contract an STI. Adolescents in the United States often choose "anything but intercourse" for sexual activity because they mistakenly believe it reduces the risk of STIs. Across the country, clinicians report rising diagnoses of herpes and human papillomavirus (HPV), which can cause genital warts, and is now thought to affect 15 percent of the teen population. Girls 15 to 19 have higher rates of gonorrhea than any other age group. One-quarter of all new HIV cases occur in those under the age of 21. Multrine also states in her article that according to a March survey by the Kaiser Family Foundation, eighty-one percent of parents want schools to discuss the use of condoms and contraception with their children. They also believe students should be able to be tested for STIs. Furthermore, teachers want to address such topics with their students. But, although 9 in 10 sex education instructors across the country believe that students should be taught about contraceptives in school, over one quarter report receiving explicit instructions from school boards and administrators not to do so. According to anthropologist Margaret Mead, the turmoil found in adolescence in Western society has a cultural rather than a physical cause; they reported that societies where young women engaged in free sexual activity had no such adolescent turmoil.

== Culture ==
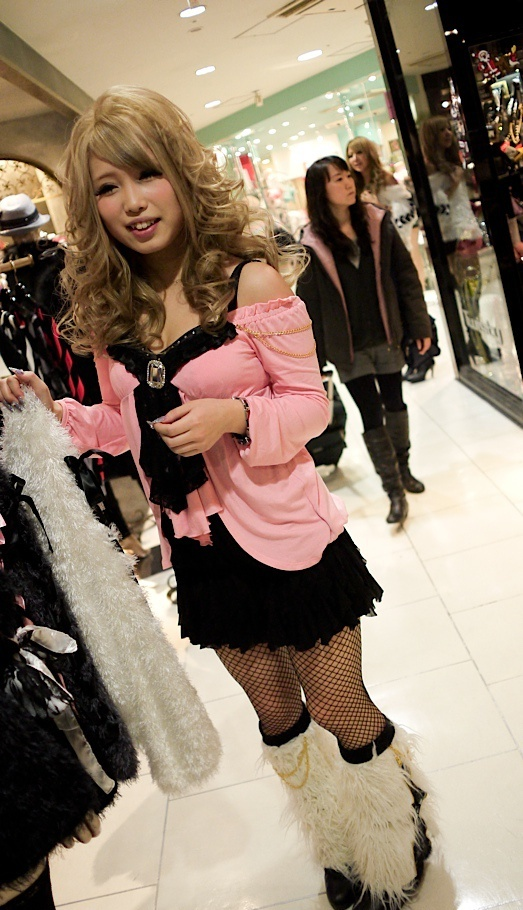
Shibuya 109 gyaru store staff from the Japanese brand Golds Infinity in 2010. Gyaru is a fashion style popular with youth.

There are certain characteristics of adolescent development that are more rooted in culture than in human biology or cognitive structures. Culture has been defined as the "symbolic and behavioral inheritance received from the past that provides a community framework for what is valued". Culture is learned and socially shared, and it affects all aspects of an individual's life. Social responsibilities, sexual expression, and belief system development, for instance, are all things that are likely to vary by culture. Furthermore, distinguishing characteristics of youth, including dress, music and other uses of media, employment, art, food and beverage choices, recreation, and language, all constitute a youth culture. For these reasons, culture is a prevalent and powerful presence in the lives of adolescents, and therefore we cannot fully understand today's adolescents without studying and understanding their culture. However, "culture" should not be seen as synonymous with nation or ethnicity. Many cultures are present within any given country and racial or socioeconomic group. Furthermore, to avoid ethnocentrism, researchers must be careful not to define the culture's role in adolescence in terms of their own cultural beliefs.

In his short book "The Teenage Consumer" published in July 1959, the British market research pioneer Mark Abrams identified the emergence of a new economic group of people aged 13–25. Compared to children, people in this age range had more money, more discretion on how they chose to spend it, and greater mobility through the advent of the motor car. Compared to adults, people in this age range had fewer responsibilities and therefore made different choices on how to spend their money. These unique characteristics of this new economic group presented challenges and opportunities to advertisers. Mark Abrams coined the term "teenager" to describe this group of consumers aged 13–25.

In Britain, teenagers first came to public attention during the Second World War, when there were fears of juvenile delinquency. By the 1950s, the media presented teenagers in terms of generational rebellion. The exaggerated moral panic among politicians and the older generation was typically belied by the growth in intergenerational cooperation between parents and children. Many working-class parents, enjoying newfound economic security, eagerly took the opportunity to encourage their teens to enjoy more adventurous lives. Schools were falsely portrayed as dangerous blackboard jungles under the control of rowdy kids. The media distortions of the teens as too affluent, and as promiscuous, delinquent, counter-cultural rebels do not reflect the actual experiences of ordinary young adults, particularly young women.

=== Autonomy ===
The degree to which adolescents are perceived as autonomous beings varies widely by culture, as do the behaviors that represent this emerging autonomy. Psychologists have identified three main types of autonomy: emotional independence, behavioral autonomy, and cognitive autonomy. Emotional autonomy is defined in terms of an adolescent's relationships with others, and often includes the development of more mature emotional connections with adults and peers. Behavioral autonomy encompasses an adolescent's developing ability to regulate their own behavior, to act on personal decisions, and to self-govern. Cultural differences are especially visible in this category because it concerns issues of dating, social time with peers, and time-management decisions. Cognitive autonomy describes the capacity for an adolescent to partake in processes of independent reasoning and decision-making without excessive reliance on social validation. Converging influences from adolescent cognitive development, expanding social relationships, an increasingly adultlike appearance, and the acceptance of more rights and responsibilities enhance feelings of autonomy for adolescents. Proper development of autonomy has been tied to good mental health, high self-esteem, self-motivated tendencies, positive self-concepts, and self-initiating and regulating behaviors. Furthermore, it has been found that adolescents' mental health is best when their feelings about autonomy match closely with those of their parents.

A questionnaire called the teen timetable has been used to measure the age at which individuals believe adolescents should be able to engage in behaviors associated with autonomy. This questionnaire has been used to gauge differences in cultural perceptions of adolescent autonomy, finding, for instance, that White parents and adolescents tend to expect autonomy earlier than those of Asian descent. It is, therefore, clear that cultural differences exist in perceptions of adolescent autonomy, and such differences have implications for the lifestyles and development of adolescents. In sub-Saharan African youth, the notions of individuality and freedom may not be useful in understanding adolescent development. Rather, African notions of childhood and adolescent development are relational and interdependent.

=== Social roles and responsibilities ===
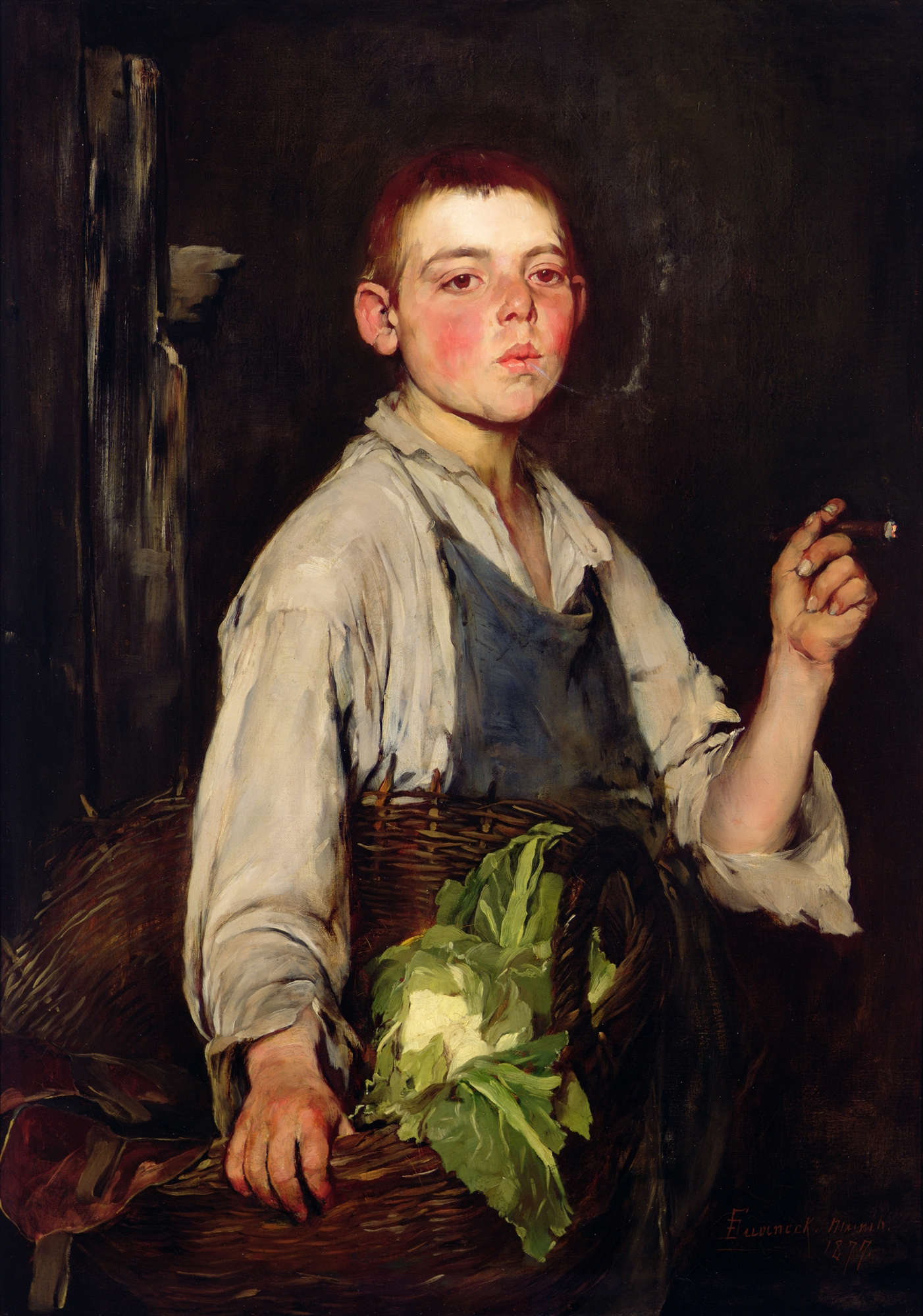
Painting of an apprentice cobbler, 1877. Despite his youthful appearance, he has taken on adult roles – working for pay and smoking tobacco.

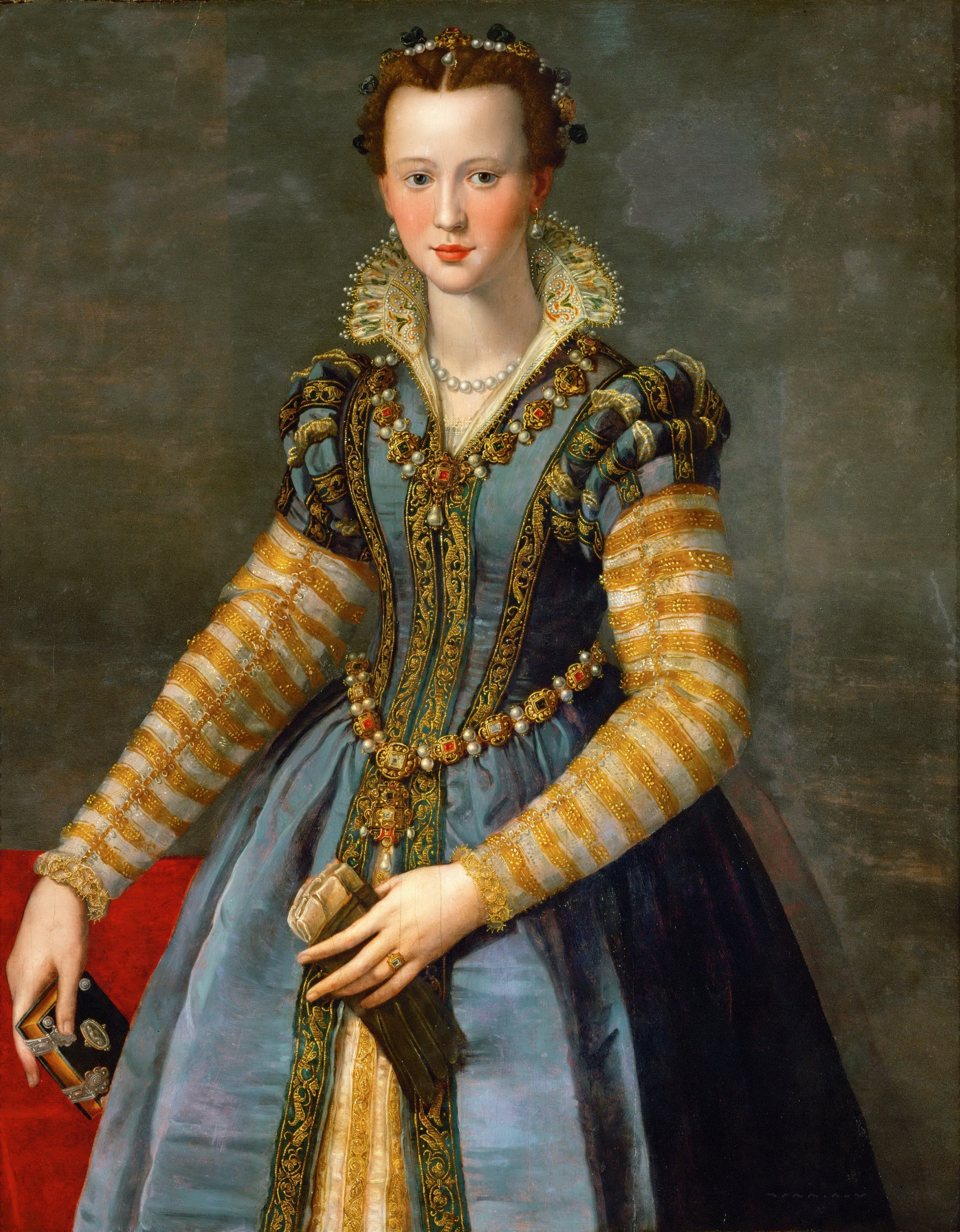
Portrait of a noble girl c. 1571

The lifestyle of an adolescent in a given culture is profoundly shaped by the roles and responsibilities he or she is expected to assume. The extent to which an adolescent is expected to share family responsibilities is one large determining factor in normative adolescent behavior. For instance, adolescents in certain cultures are expected to contribute significantly to household chores and responsibilities. Household chores are frequently divided into self-care tasks and family-care tasks. However, specific household responsibilities for adolescents may vary by culture, family type, and adolescent age. Some research has shown that adolescent participation in family work and routines has a positive influence on the development of an adolescent's feelings of self-worth, care, and concern for others.

In addition to the sharing of household chores, certain cultures expect adolescents to share in their family's financial responsibilities. According to family economic and financial education specialists, adolescents develop sound money management skills through the practices of saving and spending money, as well as through planning ahead for future economic goals. Differences between families in the distribution of financial responsibilities or provision of allowance may reflect various social background circumstances and intrafamilial processes, which are further influenced by cultural norms and values, as well as by the business sector and market economy of a given society. For instance, in many developing countries it is common for children to attend fewer years of formal schooling so that, when they reach adolescence, they can begin working.

While adolescence is a time frequently marked by participation in the workforce, the number of adolescents in the workforce is much lower now than in years past as a result of increased accessibility and perceived importance of formal higher education. For example, half of all 16-year-olds in China were employed in 1980, whereas less than one fourth of this same cohort were employed in 1990.

Furthermore, the amount of time adolescents spend on work and leisure activities varies greatly by culture as a result of cultural norms and expectations, as well as various socioeconomic factors. American teenagers spend less time in school or working and more time on leisure activities—which include playing sports, socializing, and caring for their appearance—than do adolescents in many other countries. These differences may be influenced by cultural values of education and the amount of responsibility adolescents are expected to assume in their family or community.

Time management, financial roles, and social responsibilities of adolescents are therefore closely connected with the education sector and processes of career development for adolescents, as well as to cultural norms and social expectations. In many ways, adolescents' experiences with their assumed social roles and responsibilities determine the length and quality of their initial pathway into adult roles.

=== Belief system development ===
Adolescence is frequently characterized by a transformation of an adolescent's understanding of the world, the rational direction towards a life course, and the active seeking of new ideas rather than the unquestioning acceptance of adult authority. An adolescent begins to develop a unique belief system through their interaction with social, familial, and cultural environments. While organized religion is not necessarily a part of every adolescent's life experience, youth are still held responsible for forming a set of beliefs about themselves, the world around them, and whatever higher powers they may or may not believe in. This process is often accompanied or aided by cultural traditions that intend to provide a meaningful transition to adulthood through a ceremony, ritual, confirmation, or rite of passage.

=== Sexuality ===
Many cultures define the transition into adultlike sexuality by specific biological or social milestones in an adolescent's life. For example, menarche (the first menstrual period of a female), or semenarche (the first ejaculation of a male) are frequent sexual defining points for many cultures. In addition to biological factors, an adolescent's sexual socialization is highly dependent upon whether their culture takes a restrictive or permissive attitude toward teen or premarital sexual activity. In the United States specifically, adolescents are said to have "raging hormones" that drive their sexual desires. These sexual desires are then dramatized regarding teen sex and seen as "a site of danger and risk; that such danger and risk is a source of profound worry among adults". There is little to no normalization regarding teenagers having sex in the U.S., which causes conflict in how adolescents are taught about sex education. There is a constant debate about whether abstinence-only sex education or comprehensive sex education should be taught in schools and this stems back to whether or not the country it is being taught in is permissive or restrictive. Restrictive cultures overtly discourage sexual activity in unmarried adolescents or until an adolescent undergoes a formal rite of passage. These cultures may attempt to restrict sexual activity by separating males and females throughout their development, or through public shaming and physical punishment when sexual activity does occur. In less restrictive cultures, there is more tolerance for displays of adolescent sexuality, or of the interaction between males and females in public and private spaces. Less restrictive cultures may tolerate some aspects of adolescent sexuality, while objecting to other aspects. For instance, some cultures find teenage sexual activity acceptable but teenage pregnancy highly undesirable. Other cultures do not object to teenage sexual activity or teenage pregnancy, as long as they occur after marriage. In permissive societies, overt sexual behavior among unmarried teens is perceived as acceptable, and is sometimes even encouraged. Regardless of whether a culture is restrictive or permissive, there are likely to be discrepancies in how females versus males are expected to express their sexuality. Cultures vary in how overt this double standard is—in some it is legally inscribed, while in others it is communicated through social convention. Lesbian, gay, bisexual and transgender youth face much discrimination through bullying from those unlike them and may find telling others that they are gay to be a traumatic experience. The range of sexual attitudes that a culture embraces could thus be seen to affect the beliefs, lifestyles, and societal perceptions of its adolescents.

=== Legal issues, rights and privileges ===
==== General issues ====
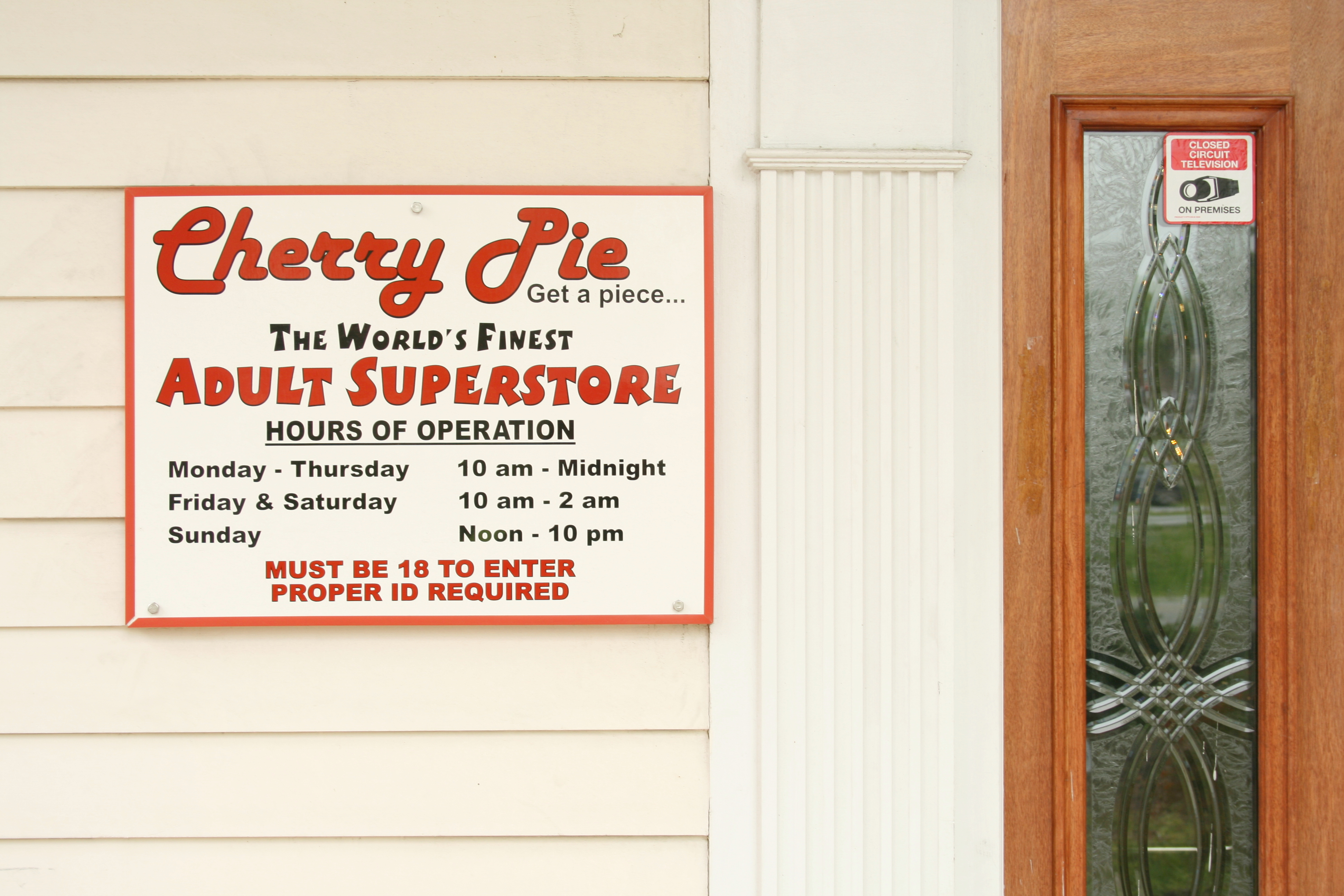
A sign outside a sex shop reads "Must Be 18 To Enter" in Chapel Hill, North Carolina.

Adolescence is a period frequently marked by increased rights and privileges for individuals. While cultural variation exists for legal rights and their corresponding ages, considerable consistency is found across cultures. Furthermore, since the advent of the Convention on the Rights of the Child in 1989 (children here defined as under 18), almost every country in the world (except the U.S. and South Sudan) has legally committed to advancing an anti-discriminatory stance towards young people of all ages. This includes protecting children against unchecked child labor, enrollment in the military, prostitution, and pornography. In many societies, those who reach a certain age (often 18, though this varies) are considered to have reached the age of majority and are legally regarded as adults who are responsible for their actions. People below this age are considered minors or children. A person below the age of majority may gain adult rights through legal emancipation.

The legal working age in Western countries is usually 14 to 16, depending on the number of hours and type of employment under consideration. Many countries also specify a minimum school leaving age, at which a person is legally allowed to leave compulsory education. This age varies greatly cross-culturally, spanning from 10 to 18, which further reflects the diverse ways formal education is viewed in cultures around the world.

In most democratic countries, a citizen is eligible to vote at age 18. In a minority of countries, the voting age is as low as 16 (for example, Brazil), and at one time was as high as 25 in Uzbekistan.

The age of consent to sexual activity varies widely between jurisdictions, ranging from 12 to 20 years, as does the age at which people are allowed to marry. Specific legal ages for adolescents that also vary by culture are enlisting in the military, gambling, and the purchase of alcohol, cigarettes or items with parental advisory labels. The legal coming of age often does not correspond with the sudden realization of autonomy; many adolescents who have legally reached adult age are still dependent on their guardians or peers for emotional and financial support. Nonetheless, new legal privileges converge with shifting social expectations to usher in a phase of heightened independence or social responsibility for most legal adolescents.

==== Alcohol and illicit drug use ====
===== Prevalence =====
Following a steady decline beginning in the late 1990s up through the mid-2000s and a moderate increase in the early 2010s, illicit drug use among adolescents has roughly plateaued in the U.S. Aside from alcohol, marijuana is the most commonly indulged drug habit during adolescent years. Data collected by the National Institute on Drug Abuse shows that between the years of 2015 and 2018, past year marijuana usage among 8th graders declined from 11.8% to 10.5%; among 10th grade students, usage rose from 25.4% to 27.50%; and among 12th graders, usage rose slightly from 34.9% to 35.9%. Additionally, while the early 2010s saw a surge in the popularity of MDMA, usage has stabilized with 2.2% of 12th graders using MDMA in the past year in the U.S. The heightened usage of ecstasy most likely ties in at least to some degree with the rising popularity of rave culture.

One significant contribution to the increase in teenage substance abuse is an increase in the availability of prescription medication. With an increase in the diagnosis of behavioral and attentional disorders for students, taking pharmaceutical drugs such as Vicodin and Adderall for pleasure has become a prevalent activity among adolescents: 9.9% of high school seniors report having abused prescription drugs within the past year.

In the U.S., teenage alcohol use rose in the late 2000s and is currently stable at a moderate level. Out of a polled body of U.S. students age 12–18, 8.2% of 8th graders reported having been on at least one occasion having consumed alcohol within the previous month; for 10th graders, the number was 18.6%, and for 12th graders, 30.2%. More drastically, cigarette smoking has become a far less prevalent activity among American middle- and high-school students; in fact, a greater number of teens now smoke marijuana than smoke cigarettes, with one recent study showing a respective 23.8% versus 43.6% of surveyed high school seniors. Recent studies have shown that male late adolescents are far more likely to smoke cigarettes rather than females. The study indicated that there was a discernible gender difference in the prevalence of smoking among the students. The finding of the study shows that more males than females began smoking when they were in primary and high schools whereas most females started smoking after high school. This may be attributed to recent changing social and political views towards marijuana; issues such as medicinal use and legalization have tended towards painting the drug in a more positive light than historically, while cigarettes continue to be vilified due to associated health risks.

Different drug habits often relate to one another in a highly significant manner. It has been demonstrated that adolescents who drink at least to some degree may be as much as sixteen times more likely than non-drinkers to use illicit drugs.

===== Social influence =====
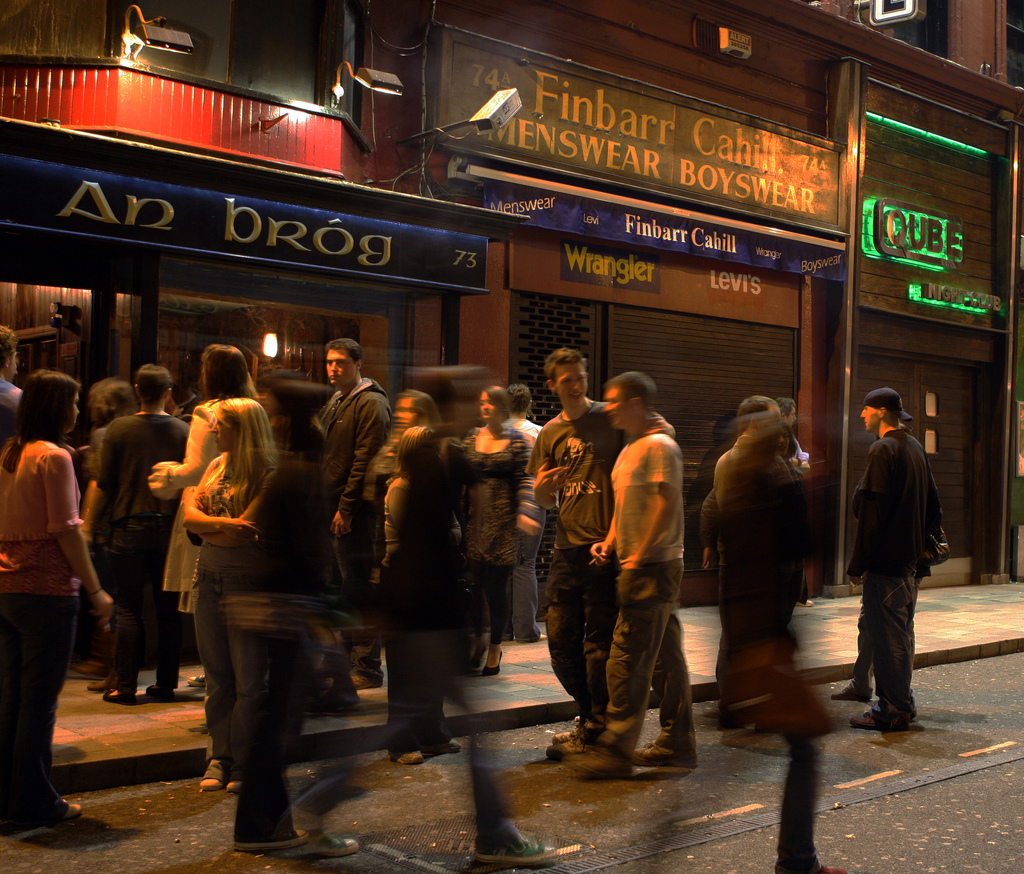
Irish teenagers over 18 hanging around outside a bar. People under 18 are not allowed to drink alcohol outside the home.

Peer acceptance and social norms gain a significantly greater hand in directing behavior at the onset of adolescence; as such, the alcohol and illegal drug habits of teens tend to be shaped largely by the substance use of friends and other classmates. In fact, studies suggest that more significantly than actual drug norms, an individual's perception of the illicit drug use by friends and peers is highly associated with their own habits in substance use during both middle and high school, a relationship that increases in strength over time. Whereas social influences on alcohol use and marijuana use tend to work directly in the short term, peer and friend norms on smoking cigarettes in middle school have a profound effect on one's own likelihood to smoke cigarettes well into high school. Perhaps the strong correlation between peer influence in middle school and cigarette smoking in high school may be explained by the addictive nature of cigarettes, which could lead many students to continue their smoking habits from middle school into late adolescence.

===== Demographic factors =====
Until mid-to-late adolescence, boys and girls show relatively little difference in drinking motives. Distinctions between the reasons for alcohol consumption of males and females begin to emerge around ages 14–15; overall, boys tend to view drinking in a more social light than girls, who report on average a more frequent use of alcohol as a coping mechanism. The latter effect appears to shift in late adolescence and onset of early adulthood (20–21 years of age); however, despite this trend, age tends to bring a greater desire to drink for pleasure rather than coping in both boys and girls.

Drinking habits and the motives behind them often reflect certain aspects of an individual's personality; in fact, four dimensions of the Five-Factor Model of personality demonstrate associations with drinking motives (all but 'Openness'). Greater enhancement motives for alcohol consumption tend to reflect high levels of extraversion and sensation-seeking in individuals; such enjoyment motivation often also indicates low conscientiousness, manifesting in lowered inhibition and a greater tendency towards aggression. On the other hand, drinking to cope with negative emotional states correlates strongly with high neuroticism and low agreeableness. Alcohol use as a negative emotion control mechanism often links with many other behavioral and emotional impairments, such as anxiety, depression, and low self-esteem.

Research has generally shown striking uniformity across different cultures in the motives behind teen alcohol use. Social engagement and personal enjoyment appear to play a fairly universal role in adolescents' decision to drink throughout separate cultural contexts. Surveys conducted in Argentina, Hong Kong, and Canada have each indicated the most common reason for drinking among adolescents to relate to pleasure and recreation; 80% of Argentinian teens reported drinking for enjoyment, while only 7% drank to improve a bad mood. The most prevalent answers among Canadian adolescents were to "get in a party mood," 18%; "because I enjoy it," 16%; and "to get drunk," 10%. In Hong Kong, female participants most frequently reported drinking for social enjoyment, while males most frequently reported drinking to feel the effects of alcohol.

=== Media ===
==== Body image ====
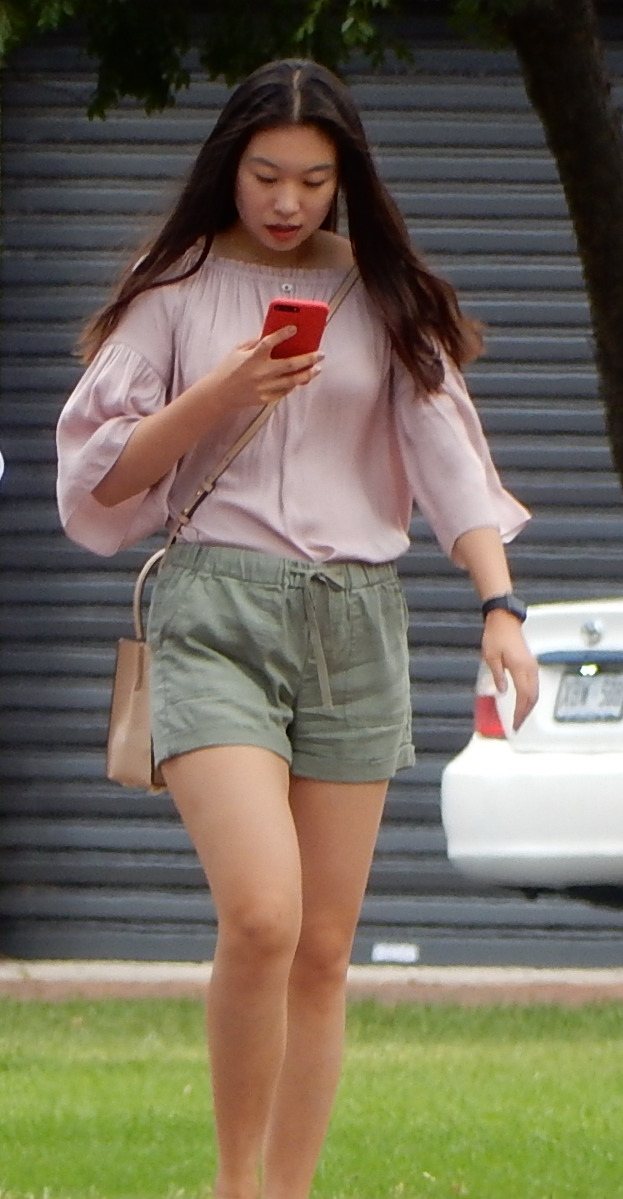
A girl looking at her smartphone

Much research has been conducted on the psychological ramifications of body image on adolescents. Modern day teenagers are exposed to more media on a daily basis than any generation before them. As such, modern day adolescents are exposed to many representations of ideal, societal beauty. The concept of a person being unhappy with their own image or appearance has been defined as "body dissatisfaction". In teenagers, body dissatisfaction is often associated with body mass, low self-esteem, and atypical eating patterns that can result in health procedures. Scholars continue to debate the effects of media on body dissatisfaction in teens.

==== Media profusion ====
Because exposure to media has increased over the past decade, adolescents' use of computers, cell phones, stereos and televisions to gain access to various mediums of popular culture has also increased. Almost all American households have at least one television, more than three-quarters of all adolescents' homes have access to the Internet, and more than 90% of American adolescents use the Internet at least occasionally. As a result of the amount of time adolescents spend using these devices, their total media exposure is high. From 1996 to 2006, the amount of time that adolescents spent on the computer greatly increased. Online activities with the highest rates of use among adolescents are video games (78% of adolescents), email (73%), instant messaging (68%), social networking sites (65%), news sources (63%), music (59%), and videos (57%).

==== Social networking ====
In the 2000s, social networking sites proliferated and a high proportion of adolescents used them. As of 2012, 73% of 12–17 year olds reported having at least one social networking profile; two-thirds (68%) of teens texted every day, half (51%) visited social networking sites daily, and 11% sent or received tweets at least once every day. More than a third (34%) of teens visited their main social networking site several times a day. One in four (23%) teens were "heavy" social media users, meaning they used at least two different types of social media each and every day.

Although research has been inconclusive, some findings have indicated that electronic communication negatively affects adolescents' social development, replaces face-to-face communication, impairs their social skills, and can sometimes lead to unsafe interaction with strangers. A 2015 review reported that "adolescents lack awareness of strategies to cope with cyberbullying, which has been consistently associated with an increased likelihood of depression." Furthermore, in 2020, 32% of adolescent girls that use Instagram reported feeling worse about their body image after using the platform. Studies have shown differences in the ways the internet negatively impacts adolescents' social functioning. Online socializing tends to make girls particularly vulnerable, while socializing in Internet cafés seems only to affect boys' academic achievement. However, other research suggests that Internet communication brings friends closer and is beneficial for socially anxious teens, who find it easier to interact socially online.

=== Transitions into adulthood ===
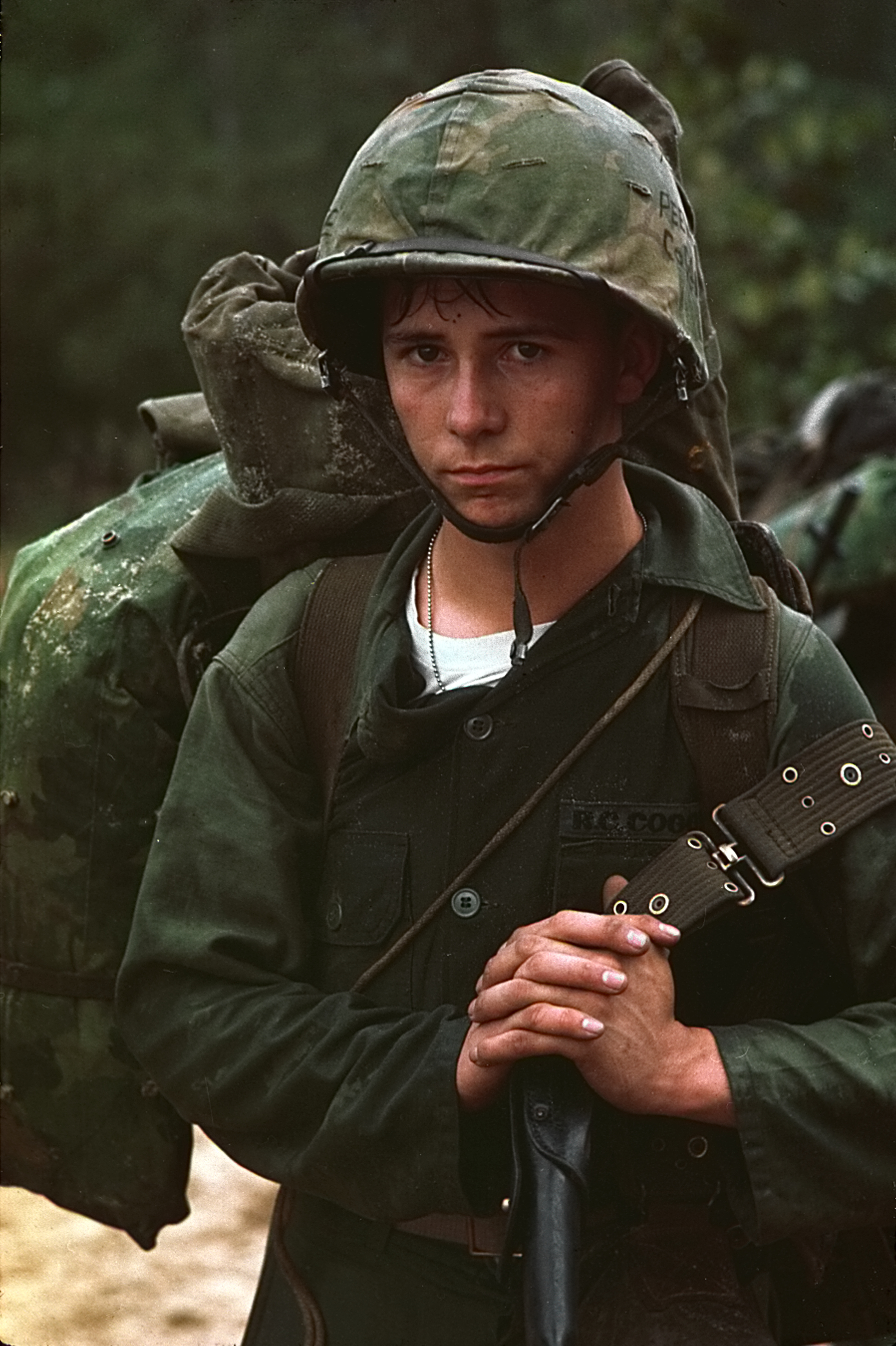
A young U.S. Marine in the Vietnam War, 1965

A broad way of defining adolescence is the transition from child-to-adulthood. According to Hogan & Astone (1986), this transition can include markers such as leaving school, starting a full-time job, leaving the home of origin, getting married, and becoming a parent for the first time. However, the time frame of this transition varies drastically by culture. In some countries, such as the United States, adolescence can last nearly a decade, but in others, the transition—often in the form of a ceremony—can last for only a few days.

Some examples of social and religious transition ceremonies that can be found in the U.S., as well as in other cultures around the world, are Confirmation, Bar and Bat Mitzvahs, Quinceañeras, sweet sixteens, cotillions, and débutante balls. In other countries, initiation ceremonies play an important role, marking the transition into adulthood or the entrance into adolescence. This transition may be accompanied by obvious physical changes, which can vary from a change in clothing to tattoos and scarification. Furthermore, transitions into adulthood may also vary by gender, and specific rituals may be more common for males or for females. This illuminates the extent to which adolescence is, at least in part, a social construction; it takes shape differently depending on the cultural context, and may be enforced more by cultural practices or transitions than by universal chemical or biological physical changes.

== Supporting adolescent development ==
=== Educational environments ===
Schools are among the primary developmental contexts for adolescents, and researchers have examined how well school environments match adolescents' changing needs. Jacquelynne Eccles and colleagues proposed stage-environment fit theory, which holds that some of the declines in motivation and wellbeing observed in early adolescence result not from adolescence itself but from a mismatch between adolescents' developing needs—for autonomy, meaningful work, and supportive relationships with adults—and the environments schools actually provide. On this account, the transition to middle or junior high school often moves students into settings with greater teacher control and weaker student–teacher relationships at precisely the point when their desire for autonomy is increasing. The theory predicts that environments adapted to adolescents' emerging capabilities are associated with better psychosocial outcomes, and it has informed calls for "developmentally responsive" middle-level schooling.

Several educational models have been designed explicitly around adolescent developmental needs. Maria Montessori, for instance, proposed the Erdkinder ("children of the earth")—a residential farm-school environment for adolescents aged roughly 12 to 15, in which academic study would be integrated with practical work and economic responsibility, giving adolescents opportunities to make real contributions to a community. Relatively few schools implement this model, and rigorous outcome evaluations of Montessori adolescent programs remain limited.

== Criticism ==
The concept of adolescence has been criticized by experts, such as Robert Epstein, who state that an undeveloped brain is not the main cause of teenagers' turmoils. Some have criticized the concept of adolescence because it is a relatively recent phenomenon in human history created by modern society, and have been highly critical of what they view as the infantilization of young adults in American society. In an article for Scientific American, Robert Epstein and Jennifer Ong state that "American-style teen turmoil is absent in more than 100 cultures around the world, suggesting that such mayhem is not biologically inevitable. Second, the brain itself changes in response to experiences, raising the question of whether adolescent brain characteristics are the cause of teen tumult or rather the result of lifestyle and experiences." David Moshman has also stated in regards to adolescence that brain research "is crucial for a full picture, but it does not provide an ultimate explanation."

Other critics of the concept of adolescence point at individual differences in brain growth rate, citing that some (though not all) early teens still have infantile undeveloped corpus callosums, concluding that "the adult in every adolescent" is too generalizing. These people tend to support the notion that a more interconnected brain makes more precise distinctions (citing Pavlov's comparisons of conditioned reflexes in different species) and that there is a non-arbitrary threshold at which distinctions become sufficiently precise to correct assumptions afterward as opposed to being ultimately dependent on exterior assumptions for communication. They argue that this threshold is the one at which an individual is objectively capable of speaking for himself or herself, as opposed to culturally arbitrary measures of "maturity" which often treat this ability as a sign of "immaturity" merely because it leads to questioning of authorities. These people also stress the low probability of the threshold being reached at a birthday, and instead advocate non-chronological emancipation at the threshold of afterward correction of assumptions. They sometimes cite similarities between "adolescent" behavior and KZ syndrome (inmate behavior in adults in prison camps) such as aggression being explainable by oppression and "immature" financial or other risk behavior being explainable by a way out of captivity being more worth to captive people than any incremental improvement in captivity, and argue that this theory successfully predicted remaining "immature" behavior after reaching the age of majority by means of longer-term traumatization. In this context, they refer to the fallibility of official assumptions about what is good or bad for an individual, concluding that paternalistic "rights" may harm the individual. They also argue that since it never took many years to move from one group to another to avoid inbreeding in the Paleolithic, evolutionary psychology is unable to account for a long period of "immature" risk behavior.

== See also ==
- Adolescent medicine
- Adolescent sleep
- Children and adolescents in the United States
- Clique
- Emerging adulthood and early adulthood
- Ephebophilia – a sexual preference in which an adult is primarily or exclusively sexually attracted to mid to late adolescents
- Fear of youth
- History of childhood in the United States, for youth before 2010.
- Student voice
- Suitable age and discretion
- Timeline of young people's rights in the United Kingdom
- Timeline of young people's rights in the United States
- Young adult fiction
- Young adult (psychology)
- Young worker safety and health
- Youth

Preceded by Preadolescence	Stages of human development Adolescence	Succeeded by Young adult
