= Adolescent sleep =

Typically poor in duration and quality

Adolescent sleep is typically poor in duration and quality. Sleep duration and quality reduce to suboptimal levels, and sleep duration variability and latency increases during adolescence. Sleep recommendations suggest that adolescents (12-19) should obtain 6–12 hours of sleep per night. Additionally, there is a shift in the body's circadian rhythm such that sleep and wake timings become later during adolescence. Technology, social factors, and physical development are thought to contribute to poor sleep during this time. Poor sleep duration and quality in adolescents has been linked with altered brain functioning and development, poor mental and physical health, as well as higher rates of disease and mortality. The concerns surrounding poor sleep during adolescence has garnered significant public attention, especially concerning policies related to school start times. Many evidences suggest that sleep contributes positively to attention, behavior, and academic achievement for adolescents.

== Developmental changes ==
Adolescent sleep worsens with age. Specifically, longitudinal research demonstrates that sleep duration shortens during the transition from high school to college. Additionally, sleep efficiency (the amount of time spent asleep when in bed) decreased during this transition. Day-to-day variability in sleep duration increased during this transition, suggesting that adolescent sleep duration becomes less stable with time. A variety of social, physical, biological, and psychological factors change during adolescence which contributes to declines in sleep. In particular, puberty has been explored as a contributor to changes in adolescent sleep. Luteinizing hormone (LH) is secreted during sleep at the onset of pubertal maturation, pointing to an important relationship between sleep and pubertal development.

== Sleep recommendations ==
The National Sleep Foundation recommends that teenagers (14–17 years) obtain 8 to 10 hours of sleep. Their recommendation further stipulates that less than 7 hours and more than 11 hours of sleep may be harmful. Additionally, it is recommended that young adults (18–25 years) obtain 7 to 9 hours of sleep and avoid sleep less than 6 hours and more than 11 hours.

Adolescent sleep researchers have conducted studies to provide stronger empirical evidence for sleep recommendations. Fuligni and colleagues (2019) examined a sample of American adolescents and found that younger adolescents, especially those with elevated levels of internalizing symptoms, need more sleep in order to experience optimum levels of positive mood the next day. Additionally, another study examining Mexican-American youth found that roughly 7.5 hours of sleep was predictive of high GPA but 8.75 hours of sleep was predictive of lower internalizing symptoms. This finding suggests that optimal sleep duration differs depending on the outcome.

More research is needed to understand individual differences in sleep duration during adolescence.

== Sleep duration ==
Sleep duration has been declining since the early 90s according to research. Evidence also suggests that teen females, ethnic minorities, and those of low socioeconomic status experience the lowest durations. Puberty is thought to contribute to poor sleep during adolescence as teens undergo physical and social maturation. For adolescents, this inclination is demonstrated by their tendency to stay up later and sleep longer, particularly on holidays or weekends. A burgeoning area of adolescent sleep research is focused on understanding the contribution of technology-use to poor teen sleep. Importantly, research shows that declines in adolescent sleep duration are characteristic of adolescents around the world. The consequences of poor extend far beyond mere fatigue, leading to various physical, cognitive, and mental health issues.

=== Brain ===
Poor sleep duration has been found to be related to altered brain development during adolescence. Telzer and colleagues (2015) found that teens with greater day-to-day variability in their sleep duration had lower white matter integrity one year later. This result remained when controlling for sleep duration, which suggests that sleep variability may be more consequential for teen brain development than simply duration. Another study found that sleep duration was strongly associated with gray matter volume of the bilateral hippocampus among a sample of healthy children and adolescents.

=== Risk-taking ===
Poor sleep duration and increased risk-taking has been a well-established association in the adolescent sleep literature. A recent meta-analysis reported that poor sleep duration results in a 1.43 times greater odds of engaging in risky behaviors. The direction of the relationship between risk-taking and sleep duration is still unknown, thus causal claims cannot be made.

=== Emotion ===
A plethora of research shows that low sleep duration is linked with poor mood. Furthermore, youth who report low sleep duration also demonstrate difficulties with emotion regulation. This is of particular concern because adolescents experience fluctuations in mood as a result of pubertal maturation, however, poor sleep duration worsens mood and regulation abilities rendering these adolescents vulnerable.

== Sleep quality ==
Empirical evidence suggests that sleep quality is poor during adolescence. Poor sleep quality during adolescence has been linked with a variety of negative behaviors and outcomes. For instance, poor sleep quality has been shown to be positive associated with anxiety and depressive symptoms among teens. A study published in 2016 found that sleep quality significantly mediated the relationship between age and depressive symptoms, suggesting that the rise in depressive symptoms during adolescence is partly explained by poor sleep quality. A long line of research has also demonstrated that poor sleep quality is associated with increased risk-taking behaviors among teens. Neuroscience research (fMRI) has found that poor sleep quality is associated with greater risk-taking on a behavioral task. This risky behavior was further associated with decreased activity in cognitive control regions of the brain and increased activity in reward regions of the brain. Moreover, poor sleep quality has been found to be linked with dampened intra-network connectivity of regions in the Default Mode Network, a brain network that undergoes development during adolescence.

== Technology ==
There has been an increased interest in understanding the relationship between sleep and technology use among adolescents. In the era of social media, there is a growing concern for blue-light emitted by technology may be interfering with adolescents' ability to obtain restful and sufficient sleep. Use of technologies (i.e. television, cell phone, computer/laptop) is associated with prolonged sleep duration (the amount of time it takes to fall asleep) and shorter sleep duration among teenagers. Television use was associated with the poorest sleep duration. Adolescent technology-use has also been linked with excessive daytime sleepiness and caffeine consumption, suggesting that technology-use may interfere with sleep and may lead to increased caffeine consumption. Longitudinal data demonstrates that time spent using technology is predictive of short sleep duration, however short sleep duration was also predictive of time spent using technology. More longitudinal research with larger sample sizes is needed to clarify the mechanisms underlying the association between technology-use and sleep during adolescence.

== Chronotype ==
Adolescence is characterized by an evening chronotype preference with adolescents engaging in late bed and wake times. An evening chronotype is unique to the period of adolescence compared to childhood and adulthood which are characterized by a morning chronotype. Eveningness during adolescence is linked with increased substance use, worse overall mood, poor diet, increased depressive symptoms, increased anxiety symptoms, and poor emotion regulation. Beyond conveying bed and wake times, chronotype is also indicative of optimal times of functioning. For instance, researchers tested adolescents on their executive functioning performance at two times: once at a time that is optimal for chronotype (i.e. evening for evening chronotypes vs. morning for morning chronotypes) and once at a time that is suboptimal for chronotype (i.e. morning for evening chronotypes vs. evening for morning chronotypes). They found that morning adolescents tested in the morning performed better than in the evening, and evening chronotype adolescents tested in the evening performed better than in the morning.

== Sleep measures ==
=== Pittsburgh Sleep Quality Index ===
The Pittsburgh Sleep Quality Index (PSQI) is a well-validated and widely used self-report questionnaire that measures sleep quality. Nineteen items are combined to create seven component scores of sleep, and those component scores are then used to create an overall “global score” of sleep quality. The seven components consist of subjective sleep quality, sleep disturbances, sleep duration, sleep latency, habitual sleep efficiency, use of sleep medications, and daytime dysfunction. The PSQI has a high internal reliability (Cronbach's alpha = 0.83). The PSQI has been used in many studies assessing adolescent sleep quality.

=== Actigraphy ===
Actigraph watches are commonly used to gather objective measures of sleep. The watch is worn on the non-dominant wrist and measures sleep using body movement. Data gathered from the watch includes sleep duration, number of awakenings, total minutes of nighttime awakenings, and latency.

=== Morningness Eveningness Questionnaire (MEQ) ===
The first valid and reliable measure of chronotype was created by Horne and Östberg (1976): Morningness-Eveningness Questionnaire (MEQ) contains 19 items tapping sleep and wake time preferences. Sample items include “Assuming adequate environmental conditions, how easy do you find getting up in the mornings?” and “Considering your own ‘feeling best’ rhythm, at what time would you get up if you were entirely free to plan your day?”. The questionnaire consists of both Likert and timescale items, and items are scored to obtain a composite score. Since its creation, the MEQ has been validated in some adolescent and young adult samples. Early assessments of this questionnaire's psychometric properties revealed that the scale has good internal consistency (a = .82).
