= Dating violence =

Violence among unmarried couples

Dating abuse or dating violence is the perpetration or threat of an act of violence by at least one member of an unmarried couple on the other member in the context of dating or courtship. It also arises when one partner tries to maintain power and control over the other through abuse or violence, for example when a relationship has broken down. This abuse or violence can take a number of forms, such as sexual assault, sexual harassment, threats, physical violence, verbal, mental, or emotional abuse, social sabotage, and stalking. In extreme cases it may manifest in date rape. It can include psychological abuse, emotional blackmail, sexual abuse, physical abuse and psychological manipulation.

Dating violence crosses all racial, age, economic and social lines. The Center for Relationship Abuse Awareness describes dating abuse as a "pattern of abusive and coercive behaviors used to maintain power and control over a former or current intimate partner."

== Profiles of abuser and victim ==
Abuse can occur regardless of the individual's age, race, income, or other demographic traits. There are, however, many traits that abusers and victims share in common.

The Centre for Promoting Alternatives to Violence describes abusers as being obsessively jealous and possessive, overly confident, having mood swings or a history of violence or temper, seeking to isolate their partner from family, friends and colleagues, and having a tendency to blame external stressors.

Meanwhile, victims of relationship abuse share many traits as well, including: physical signs of injury, missing time at work or school, slipping performance at work or school, changes in mood or personality, increased use of drugs or alcohol, and increasing isolation from friends and family. Victims may blame themselves for any abuse that occurs or may minimize the severity of the crime. This often leads to victims choosing to stay in abusive relationships.

Strauss (2005) argues that while men inflict the greater share of injuries in domestic violence, researchers and society at large must not overlook the substantial minority of injuries inflicted by women. Additionally, Strauss notes that even relatively minor acts of physical aggression by women are a serious concern:

'Minor' assaults perpetrated by women are also a major problem, even when they do not result in injury, because they put women in danger of much more severe retaliation by men. [...] It will be argued that in order to end 'wife beating,' it is essential for women also to end what many regard as a 'harmless' pattern of slapping, kicking, or throwing something at a male partner who persists in some outrageous behavior and 'won't listen to reason.'

Similarly, Deborah Capaldi reports that a 13-year longitudinal study found that a woman's aggression towards a man was equally important as the man's tendency towards violence in predicting the likelihood of overall violence: "Since much IPV [Intimate Partner Violence] is mutual and women as well as men initiate IPV, prevention and treatment approaches should attempt to reduce women's violence as well as men's violence. Such an approach has a much higher chance of increasing women's safety." However, Capaldi's research only focused on at-risk youth, not women in general, and, therefore, may not apply to the entire population.

== Characteristics ==
=== Emotional abuse ===
- They are afraid of their date
- They are afraid of making the date angry and are unable to even disagree with the date.
- Their date has publicly embarrassed and humiliated them.

=== Psychological abuse ===
- The date threatens to use violence against them or against themself. (e.g. "If you leave me, I will kill myself".)

=== Sexual abuse ===
- The date forces their partner to have sex with them.
- They are afraid to say 'no' to the date's demand for a sexual act from them.
- The date does not respect them, and is only interested in gratifying their own sexual needs.
- The date does not care about the consequences of the sexual act or how their partner feels about it.

=== Physical abuse ===
- They were subjected to some physical attacks by their partner
- The date has held them down, pushed them, or even punched, kicked or thrown things at them.

=== Controlling behaviour ===
- The date has tried to keep them from seeing friends.
- They are restricted from contacting their family
- They are even forced to choose between the date and their family and friends.
- The date insists on knowing where they are at all times and demands that they justify everything they do.
- The date will be furious if they spoke with another person of their preferred sex.
- The date expects them to ask permission before seeking health care for themselves.
- The date dictates what they wear and how they appear in public.

== See also ==
- Date rape
- Loveisrespect, National Teen Dating Abuse Helpline, of the National Domestic Violence Hotline
- Sexual bullying
- Teen dating violence
- Violence against women
- Violence against men
