= Erdkinder =

Maria Montessori's educational philosophy for adolescents

Erdkinder (German for "Children of the Earth") is the pedagogical model developed by Maria Montessori for the education of adolescents, typically defined as ages 12 to 18. The approach represents a significant departure from the classroom-based "Children's House" model, instead advocating for a rural, land-based environment where students engage in agricultural work and economic self-sufficiency.

The philosophy is rooted in the belief that the "valorization of the personality" (the development of self-worth through social contribution and responsibility) is the primary developmental task of adolescence.

== Developmental theory ==
Montessori's model for adolescence is based on her theory of the Four Planes of Development. She characterized the third plane (ages 12-18) as a period of "psychic transition," comparable to the physical and mental sensitivities of the first plane (birth to age 6).

During this stage, Montessori argued that traditional school environments often exacerbate the "intellectual fatigue" and emotional instability commonly associated with puberty. Instead, she proposed a "school of experience in the elements of social life," where physical labor and social organization take precedence over abstract, sedentary study.

== Key components ==
The Erdkinder model is defined by three core structural elements:

=== The farm school ===
Montessori advocated for the "Center for Study and Work" to be located in the country. The rural setting is intended to provide direct experience with biology, chemistry, and meteorology through a connection to nature and agriculture, as well as a space away from the distractions of urban life where a small cohesive society can form.

=== The hostel ===
Students typically live in a hostel or residential setting on the farm. This residential component is designed to teach "the science of the home," including cooking, maintenance, and communal governance.

=== The store ===
A critical aspect of the Erdkinder is the "store," or a venue for selling the farm's produce. This provides a practical introduction to economics, accounting, and social exchange. By earning money and managing a business, adolescents gain a sense of economic independence and an understanding of how society functions.

== Curriculum ==
The Erdkinder curriculum is fully integrated into the daily operations of the farm. Academic subjects are treated as tools for solving practical problems:

- Mathematics and science: applied through land surveying, crop rotation, and business accounting.
- History: explored through the lens of human progress and the development of tools and civilization.
- Language and art: used for self-expression and the communication of ideas within the community.

== Implementation ==
While Montessori outlined the Erdkinder vision in the 1930s, widespread implementation did not occur until the late 20th century. Modern Erdkinder programs vary in their adherence to the residential requirement, with some operating as day programs that maintain a strong emphasis on land-based work and entrepreneurship. Notable programs exist across the globe, including in Australia, the Netherlands, and the United States.

== Reception and research ==
Writing in Middle Grades Review, Luz Casquejo Johnston argues that the Erdkinder incorporates many of the characteristics of effective middle level education set out in the Association for Middle Level Education's position paper This We Believe, including personalized learning, differentiated instruction, thoughtful preparation of teachers, and the building of caring communities. She notes that some Erdkinder features—student-developed plans of study and student-managed enterprise—have no direct counterpart in that framework, and points to studies of high school entrepreneurship programmes reporting increased graduation rates, college attendance, and students' sense of self-worth as outcomes consistent with what Montessori anticipated for Erdkinder graduates.

Published work on Erdkinder appears largely in Montessori-affiliated journals, particularly the NAMTA Journal, and consists mainly of descriptive and programme-development accounts. Empirical studies include John Broome's examination of civic engagement in an Erdkinder-based middle school classroom and a pilot study by R. Renee Setari and Anthony P. Setari applying social network analysis to academic assistance networks in an Erdkinder secondary school. Although peer-to-peer academic help is a stated goal of Erdkinder schools, they found that teachers were the principal source of assistance to students.

== See also ==
- Democratic education
- Experiential learning
- Montessori education
- Vocational education
