= Deborah M. Capaldi =

Developmental psychologist

Deborah Capaldi
- Occupation: Senior Scientist
- Awards: Boyd McCandless Award, APA Division 7 (1998)

Academic background
- Education: University of York, University of Oregon

Deborah M. Capaldi is a developmental psychologist known for her research on at-risk male youth and the intergenerational transmission of substance use, antisocial behavior, intimate partner violence, and child abuse. She is a senior scientist at the Oregon Social Learning Center. Her current projects focus on child exposure to family violence and parenting practices of at-risk parents.

She was recipient of the 1998 Boyd McCandless Young Scientist Award from the American Psychological Association (APA), Division 7. In 2009, she was named a Fellow of the Society for Couple and Family Psychology, APA Division 43.

== Biography ==
Deborah M. Capaldi was born in Leeds, England, and holds dual citizenship with the United States and the European Union. She attended the University of York and obtained a Bachelor of the Arts in Sociology in 1970. Capaldi continued her education at the University of Oregon, where she completed a Masters of Science in Industrial/Organizational Psychology in 1983 and a PhD in Developmental Psychology in 1991. Her dissertation, conducted under the supervision of Gerald Patterson, was titled The co-occurrence of conduct problems and depressive symptoms in early adolescent boys: A longitudinal study of general adjustment and familial factors.

From 1983 to the present, Capaldi has worked as a scientist at the Oregon Social Learning Center where her research has been supported by grants from the National Institute of Child Health and Human Development, the National Institute of Mental Health, the National Institute on Alcohol Abuse and Alcoholism, and the National Institute on Drug Abuse.

== Research ==
Capaldi is known for her research on the developmental trajectories of youth, especially males, growing up under conditions of adversity due to poverty and family circumstances. Some of her most influential work has examined environmental factors, such as a history of parental transitions due to break-ups or divorce and ineffective parental monitoring practices, in relation to adjustment problems, antisocial conduct, deviant behavior, and depression in adolescent males. Her longitudinal research indicates considerable stability in both conduct problems and depressive symptoms of adolescent males.

Capaldi is a senior scientist with the Oregon Youth Study, a longitudinal study of the etiology and life course of antisocial behaviors in males. The Oregon Youth Study focuses on men's relationships with their intimate partners and children. The study has documented over three generations the intergenerational transmission of parenting style, internalizing and externalizing behaviors, and substance use. This longitudinal study also established associations between parental history of abuse and their own abusive behavior towards their children: A group of parents reported their experiences of abuse during childhood; ten years later, their adolescent male children reported their parents’ abusive behavior towards them. The researchers found that parents who had experienced child abuse over multiple occasions were more likely to become abusive themselves.

Capaldi and her colleagues have also studied factors associated with increased risk for dysfunctional romantic relationships in young adult males. Their longitudinal research identifies impulsive aggression and suicide attempts in adolescence as risk factors for later maladaptive relationship behaviors, such as physical and psychological aggression toward an intimate partner and domestic violence. Capaldi's research has also shown that a history of substance use problems, especially involving cannabis and hallucinogens, is predictive of increased risk of intimate partner violence among men. Other research has linked antisocial behavior, substance use, and low parental monitoring with heightened sexual risk behaviors, including increased numbers of intimate partners and contraction of sexually transmitted diseases.

== Representative publications ==
- Capaldi, D. M., & Clark, S. (1998). Prospective family predictors of aggression toward female partners for at-risk young men. Developmental Psychology, 34(6), 1175–1188.
- Capaldi, D. M., Knoble, N. B., Shortt, J. W., & Kim, H. K. (2012). A systematic review of risk factors for intimate partner violence. Partner Abuse, 3(2), 231–280.
- Capaldi, D. M., & Patterson, G. R. (1991). Relation of parental transitions to boys' adjustment problems: I. A linear hypothesis: II. Mothers at risk for transitions and unskilled parenting. Developmental Psychology, 27(3), 489–504.
- Capaldi, D. M., & Rothbart, M. K. (1992). Development and validation of an early adolescent temperament measure. The Journal of Early Adolescence, 12(2), 153–173.
- Dishion, T. J., Capaldi, D., Spracklen, K. M., & Li, F. (1995). Peer ecology of male adolescent drug use. Development and Psychopathology, 7(4), 803–824.
- Patterson, G. R., Capaldi, D., & Bank, L. (1991). An early starter model for predicting delinquency. In D. J. Pepler & K. H. Rubin (Eds.), The development and treatment of childhood aggression (pp. 139–168). Hillsdale, NJ, US: Lawrence Erlbaum Associates, Inc.
