= Adolescent clique =

Cliques that develop among adolescents

Adolescent cliques are cliques that develop amongst adolescents. In the social sciences, the word "clique" is used to describe a large group of 6 to 12 "who interact with each other more regularly and intensely than others in the same setting". Cliques are distinguished from "crowds" in that their members socially interact with one another more than the typical crowd (e.g. hang out together, go shopping, play sports etc.). Crowds, on the other hand, are defined by reputation. Although the word 'clique' or 'cliquey' is often used in day-to-day conversation to describe relational aggression or snarky, gossipy behaviors of groups of socially dominant teenage girls, that is not always accurate. Interacting with cliques is part of normative social development regardless of gender, ethnicity, or popularity. Although cliques are most commonly studied during adolescence and in educational settings, they can exist in all age groups and settings.

== Definition ==
As children enter adolescence, cultural, biological and cognitive changes cause variation in their daily lives. Adolescents spend far less time with their parents and begin participating in both structured and unstructured peer activities. Without the direct presence of their parents or other adults, their peer network begins to become the primary context for most socialization and activity. There was an explanation given by B. Bradford Brown on the psychological development stages in adolescents, and one of the stages He named "to fit in" stage, which means to find secure affiliations and obtain approval from peers. He said that adolescents spend a lot more time with their peers than younger children, and are more influence by the peer group than younger children. These social "cliques" fundamentally influence adolescent life and development. Perhaps because they are perceived as an external threat to parental authority, undesired changes in adolescent behavior are often attributed to cliques. In these situations, cliques are described as "social grouping[s] of persons that exhibit a great deal of peer pressure on its members and is exclusive, based on superficial differences". Researchers, however, question these assumptions: based on empiric data from both experiments and ethnographies they suggest that clique structure characterizes many friendship networks within any given school, not all of which negatively affect adolescents. A more neutral and scientific definition of clique is "a grouping of persons who interact with each other more regularly and intensely than others in the same setting".

Although cliques can range from two to twelve people, cliques typically consist of five or six people who are homogeneous in age, gender, race, social status, and socioeconomic background. More subtle determinant of group membership, such as shared interests and values, take precedence as adolescents develop more sophisticated, abstract cognitive functions (more here), which allow them to categorize individuals in more subtle ways and better interpret social interactions. Consistent group identities thus allow individuals to cope with the anonymity and intimidation that often accompany the transition into large secondary schools.

Similar cliques may re-emerge in adulthood in specific contexts, characterized by large, undifferentiated, anonymous crowds. Overall, cliques are a transitory social phase. In general, cliques first form in early adolescence with strict gender segregation, but by middle adolescence, some mixed-gender activities within the peer crowds foster close, cross-sex friendships which begin to restructure the clique. During late adolescence, the organized clique structure typically dissolves into associated sets of couples, which then remain the primary social unit into and throughout adulthood.

Cliques are different from other types of peer groups often seen in the average school, which are often reputation-based groups such as jocks or nerds. The major difference is that these reputation-based groups do not necessarily interact with each other, whereas members of a clique do interact with one another and have frequent social interactions. For example, football players are considered jocks, but not all members of a football team always interact with each other.

== Clique membership ==
=== Common misconceptions ===
Although the popular media portrays female cliques almost exclusively (see examples in movies, television, and young adult fiction), clique membership is almost equally prevalent in adolescent boys. Girls do, however, tend to form cliques earlier (11 years old as compared with 13 or 14 among boys), which may contribute to the greater popular salience of female cliques. Additionally, the activities central to most female cliques include gossip and emotional sharing; this behavior visibly increases, revealing female cliques to the outside observer. Male cliques, on the other hand, tend to center around activities that have occurred before the formation of the clique (common examples include sports and other shared activities or interests, such as music or reading), and thus may draw less attention to the appearance of male cliques. Male cliques may have also gone largely unnoticed because they often appear less exclusive toward the non-clique peer group members. This last difference may arise because males more frequently reported ambitions related to acceptance and status throughout their crowd, whereas females more often aspired to status and close bonds with only a few peers (i.e. a clique). Males were also more likely to consider actively exclusive behavior unethical, as were younger adolescents. The stereotype of cruel, unwelcoming clique members is well supported in some cases, but other cliques are more open to drifters. Both attitudes appear in some cliques of both sexes and all social groups become more permeable with age. Similarly, although adolescents tend to associate with others of the same ethnicity and socioeconomic status, clique membership is equally common across ethnicity and economic background. The characteristics of the distinct cliques within each demographic group also vary equally, although members of cliques in one crowd or demographic group may not perceive all of the distinctions in others (see also crowds).

=== Forms of association ===
A number of recent studies confirm that regardless of gender, ethnicity, or socioeconomic status, adolescents tend to fall into one of three categories: group members, liaisons, and isolates.

1. Group member: The majority of group members' social interactions occur within the same small group. They comprise less than half of any given school population at a time, with a higher concentration among girls and younger grades.
2. Liaisons: Liaisons associate with a few members of multiple cliques and are generally regarded positively by their peers.
3. Isolates: Characterized by few, if any, close peer relationships, these individuals do not regularly interact with any clique members. Isolated can be further classified by social agency:
  1. Volunteer status – these isolates deliberately avoid forming relationships.
  2. Forced status – peers actively exclude, mock, or victimize these isolates (see relational aggression and bullying).

=== Stability over time ===
Membership type is far more stable over time than membership in an individual clique: isolates generally remain socially disengaged, liaisons remain equally consistent, and "group members" frequently switch from one clique to another, but typically remain group members over time. The objective cliques themselves remain surprisingly stable as well. On average, cliques lose around one third of their members over a given school year, but new members with similar characteristics tend to replace the deserters, maintaining the general identity of the clique. Clique membership becomes more stable across time, as well as more permeable, less exclusive, and less hierarchical. Contrary to popular belief, individual friendships are far less stable across the school year. This is particularly true of high-status cliques and individuals, in which clique members must critically analyse their friendships and socialize only with their most popular peers or risk losing membership and status.

== Within clique structure ==
=== Popularity ===
Advanced and adaptable social skills are the best predictors of popularity, but further predictors of popularity are difficult to identify, primarily because the schema of "popularity" represents the interaction between two distinct concepts. Popularity breaks down into sociometric status (sometimes called "likability"), which measures peers' private feelings toward the individual, and perceived popularity, which reflects the individual's status, prestige, and power.

Socio-metric status is determined by fairly universally valuable characteristics including social skills, friendliness, and sense of humor. The foundations of perceived popularity, on the other hand, vary widely. Some popular adolescents are high in both characteristics, but they more often develop in distinct individuals and cliques, all considered "popular" during adolescence.

Regardless of popularity type, highly popular individuals influence local norms and behaviors in similar ways: "adolescents are easily swayed by the opinions of high-status peers to endorse activities they might otherwise reject and to run the other way from activities endorsed by low-status peers, even if they secretly enjoy them". The popular individuals themselves, however, fare differently depending on the root of their status. Several recent studies proved the discriminant validity of the two groups and found that perceived popularity in high school is predictive of alcohol use, sexual activity, and smoking. It may also be associated with a lasting drop in sociometric status. Several recent studies suggest that long-term outcomes are generally more positive for individuals who were neither Isolates nor among the most popular during adolescence.

== Between clique structure ==
=== Personal factors ===
A status hierarchy much like that within individual cliques organizes the various cliques within each peer crowd. The crowds within a given school are also perceived hierarchically. Crowd ranking can sometimes change but is generally quite stable across time and schools. Part of a clique's popularity status is based on the crowd with which its members associate, thus similarly popular cliques within the same crowd are more likely to move within the hierarchy than are similar crowds within the larger peer context.

Both because students meet and seek friends with others who share their interests ("selection") and because much of clique members time, both free and structured, takes place in the company of the other members ("socialization"), cliques are usually defined by common attitudes and activities. Among the most powerful determinants of clique membership are orientation toward school, orientation toward teen culture, and involvement in antisocial behavior.

==== Orientation toward school ====
Because studying time and partying time conflict, most individuals are rarely exposed to individuals from the opposite end of this spectrum during unstructured time. Membership in the same clique with peers whose values are highly distinct is thus uncommon. Individuals with only somewhat different views of school, however, are likely to belong to the same clique, and socialization is likely to decrease their differences over time. For example, girls' decisions about enrollment in advanced math are significantly related to those of their close friends. A study of 78 high schools found that even controlling for past achievement, the GPAs of an individual's close friends reliably help predict grades; in fact "of all the characteristics of friends that influence adolescents' behavior, their friends' school performance has the greatest impact, not only on their own academic achievement, but also on their involvement in problem behavior and drug use."

==== Orientation toward teen culture ====
Similar taste in music and clothing signal others with potentially shared interests and values and often suggest the leisure activities and substance use patterns of which they approve. Thus adolescents emulating similar cultural standards are likely to become friends and these friends are likely to encourage these aspects of their attitudes, behaviors, and dress. Participation in subcultures can also reinforce belonging. In many cases, clique members can be easily identified based on dress alone.

==== Antisocial activity ====
Research does not support the common belief that troubled adolescents have few or no friends. Instead, such individuals gravitate toward one another and form their own cliques, although these friendships do often differ from the friendships of more socially acceptable children. This general self-sorting trend applies in different ways to specific kinds of antisocial behavior. A few of the most studied are substance use, aggression, and depressive symptoms.

- Substance use

Similarity in substance use is one of the most powerful factors in clique development and lasting membership, even serving as the earliest predictor of cross-gender friendships and the most common basis for multi-ethnic cliques. Alcohol and drug use are predicted by the interaction between number of substance using friends, the extent of their substance use, and perceived closeness to those friends; a substance-free adolescent is thus unlikely to seek out or be accepted by a clique characterized by frequent substance use and even more unlikely to remain substance-free long after entering such clique Cliques typically fall into one of four categories and clique membership reliably predicts individual behavior.

  - High Functioning cliques consisted of "a network of high-achieving friends who were involved in school-based extracurricular activities and who reported low use of alcohol and few symptoms of depression."
  - Maladjusted cliques "showed the opposite pattern": uninvolved in school performance and organized activities, used alcohol frequently and to excess, and reported multiple symptoms of depression.
  - Disengaged cliques did not encourage engagement "in much of anything, including drinking."
  - Engaged cliques consisted of friends who "engaged in school, achieved decent grades, and neither abstained from nor abused alcohol."

Members of High Functioning and Engaged cliques demonstrated the best long-term outcomes, whereas Maladjusted clique membership predicted low achievement, chronic substance abuse, and confrontation with authorities and Disengaged clique members and others who abstained completely typically exhibited abnormally high anxiety and inhibition.

- Aggression

Gravitation toward similar peer groups can be especially dangerous for adolescents with aggressive tendencies. A recent observational study on antisocial, aggressive boys established that clique members tended to live in the same neighborhood, where they met and bonded through unstructured, unsupervised activities. Since antisocial groups encourage antisocial behavior, aggressive behaviors tend to escalate rapidly within groups of aggressive adolescents. In the case of bullies this effect is so detrimental that those without any friends are actually more likely to improve over time than those with friends and generally experience better long-term outcomes. In the most extreme cases, these groups may become gangs or practice less organized, but equally dangerous, violent delinquency

- Depression

Although these maladjusted, detrimental cliques can develop among adolescents of either gender, those based on aggression and delinquency are more often observed in males. In females, adjustment problems are more often manifested as internalizing problems, rather than the externalizing problems common among their male peers. Research shows, however, that both internalizing and externalizing behaviors are negatively related to the subjective sense of strong, reliable group belonging, even controlling for adolescent age, gender, ethnicity, family structure, and parents' educational level.

Because adolescent females, on average, both report stronger feelings of group belonging and place greater importance on this feeling than do their male peers, girls who do not feel accepted may be more susceptible than equally excluded boys to forming and conforming to cliques based on shared maladaptive behavior. If so, differences in internalizing or externalizing behaviors of adolescent boys and girls may be magnified during adolescence, contributing to the significant gender differences observed in adult outcomes such as incarceration and mood disorders. For example, the same cycle of selection and socialization known to exacerbate aggression applies to the internalizing behaviors associated with depression. One study on the emergence of depression in adolescence found that even controlling for the effects of age and pubertal development, gender predicted several small but significant differences: (a) depressive symptoms and negative peer relations predicted increasing levels of reassurance-seeking in female subjects; (b) initial levels of reassurance-seeking predicted deteriorating friendship quality among girls and initial levels of depressive symptoms, which were higher among girls, predicted low friendship stability among all subjects, and (c) "reassurance-seeking combined with poor peer experiences predicted increases in girls' depressive symptoms."

Perhaps related to the role of reassurance-seeking, those who both value and experience social acceptance are far less likely to exhibit problem behavior than those who value group membership equally, but are uncertain of their relationship. This relationships is better predicted by self-esteem than the actual quality of the relationships, although also directly related to discordance in personal and peer ratings of status. This effect likely arises cyclically: troubled children are rejected by their peers for their undesirable behavior, while rejected children receive less normative socialization and behave more problematically.

=== Demographic factors ===
Although there are exceptions, demographic factors typically influence adolescent crowd membership even before real cliques begin to form and often influence clique membership more powerfully than personal or behavioral characteristics. Many of the effects on clique composition described below may be largely attributed to crowd segregation.

==== Age ====
Because the contemporary school system divides children by age and structures the majority of most adolescents' time and social exposure, age is the most universal common factor among clique members; notable exceptions include friendships formed in neighborhoods or on the internet and those initiated with early-maturing pubertal girls, all of which are often detrimental to the younger friend.

==== Gender ====
Gender is perhaps the strongest determinant of clique composition in very early puberty. During childhood and early adolescence social segregation between is almost absolute. However, unlike other factors, gender division is temporary.

==== Socioeconomic status ====
Another, less advantageous, powerful determinant of clique formation is socioeconomic class. This trend was first published in the famous "Elmtown's Youth Study", which found that "almost never did adolescents from one social class associate with students from a class that was two ranks higher or lower". A diverse array of follow-up studies have confirmed that class-consciousness steadily increases throughout adolescence, so that by mid-adolescence clique membership across significantly different social backgrounds is highly anomalous.

==== Ethnicity ====
In the United States race remains an even stronger determinant of friendship than socioeconomic status. Like socioeconomic status, ethnicity is not a strong determinant of childhood friendships, but becomes increasingly potent with age. By high school, ethnically mixed cliques are rarely observed. This pattern of social segregation is strongest between black students and all other students and most prevalent in schools where students are divided into academic tracks. This is because various factors disadvantage black children, affecting performance in some cases and adult decisions in others so that in many cases black children are disproportionately likely to be placed in lower tracks, regardless of intelligence or performance resulting in uneven distribution between tracks in the majority of American high schools. Researchers suggest that because close friends in adolescence "usually have similar attitudes toward school, similar educational aspirations, and similar school achievement levels", early tracking may both decrease exposure to peers of other racial and socioeconomic backgrounds and decrease perceived similarity with the majority of those peers Racial divisions are most acute in tracked schools but are fundamental to crowd and clique composition in almost all American schools, and thus cannot be attributed to, nor changed by, any one educational program. More encouragingly, however, longitudinal observations suggest that interventions in early childhood may have the potential to influence social segregation: the more schools foster close cross-racial friendships in childhood the less peer group segregation manifests.

==== Religion ====
A well-established factor in clique composition is religious background, affiliation, and participation. This is somewhat confounded by overlap with socioeconomic status, but also relates to behavioral correlates of religion and selection by both individual and their peers.

=== Reputation determinants and effects ===
Cliques reputation is often determined by their most noticeable behavioral characteristic that is shared among their members. The characteristic might be so salient that it could dominate the way that members of that clique are perceived and treated by other peers regardless of the individual differences that each member has. For example, a clique group could be perceived as athletic, but say an individual in that group is very smart and gets good grades in school. That individual would be treated based on their athletic characteristics rather than their intellectual abilities. When people are treated based on a single characteristic it changes their self-image, resulting in a change in who they are. This phenomenon is known as the looking glass self; individuals become more like the way they think they are perceived by others. So for the example where the individual was treated based on their athletic abilities rather than their intelligence, that person will likely focus their attention more on sports rather than doing well in school, causing them to become even more like the clique they are a part of. This phenomenon where individuals in a group tend to be more like each other than non-group members is known as group homophily. Children almost always choose to be friends of people who share similarities with themselves, hence why similar characteristics among clique members establish the clique's reputation and allow different cliques to be told apart.

== Clique membership and social adjustment in children's same-gender cliques ==
Most people agree that children are affected by who they associate with, but what is not well understood is the specific characteristics that children of similar types of groups share. The focus of these authors' research was to discover the different emotional and social effects that members of the same cliques share. For their study they divided the 473 fourth and fifth graders into five groups, which were: competent, tough, average, withdrawn, and incompetent/aggressive. The researchers did this by having students rate their classmates on several characteristics; bright, fun, bully, withdrawn, athletic, prosocial, reactive aggression. They then measured differences among groups by asking children questions regarding peers social status and behavioral characteristics. For example, they asked participants to nominate up to three participating classmates who "tries to get what he or she wants by hitting, shoving, pushing or threatening others". In addition, they asked children questions about themselves that regarded to levels of loneliness and children's social dissatisfaction.

The researcher's discovered differences in emotional well-being and social satisfaction between different types of clique groups. They found that competent and average groups showed positive characteristics such as good interpersonal skills, whereas withdrawn, incompetent/aggressive and tough cliques lacked emotional well-being and social satisfaction. Another discovery was that social status levels did not distinguish average, competent and tough cliques from one another. Therefore, if an individual is in one of these three groups they are no more likely to have a high social status than a low social status. Their conclusion to these findings was that even when taking into account individuals social status level, the type of clique people are in has a significant effect on their social and emotional characteristics.

== Change and stability in childhood ==
A recent study done by Witvliet, Van Lier, Cuijpers and Koot shows the differences in behavioral characteristics between clique members and non-clique members in early elementary school, the stability of clique membership and whether the differences in these characteristics are gender oriented. Three hundred first-grade students (151 boys, 149 girls) from eleven different elementary schools in the Netherlands participated. The children were examined by being asked to determine their best friends. This friendship was considered valid if the elected friendship was reciprocated by the other child. The child was considered to be in a clique when the following criteria were met 1) a clique consisted of at least three children 2) each child had to have more connections with members than non-members and 3) a link had to occur between all members of clique. Children were then rated by their peers to determine who was liked the most versus who was liked the least. The children were also asked to determine behavioural characteristics of participants and who best fit the description of characteristics such as aggressive, anxious, etc. The peer study was followed through every spring and children were given a small reward for their involvement. These results were then used to compare between clique members and non-clique members. These results were also used to discuss the children's characteristics while also separating based on gender. In first grade, 29 cliques were found with an average of 5.3 members. In second grade 25 cliques were found with an average of 6.2 members. This study suggests that clique members tend to be more adjusted and that gender may have some form of influence on the results. This study showed that isolated girls would have more behavioural problems than isolated boys.

== Effect of cliques on the development of psychopathology in children ==
Researches have often conducted studies to determine whether membership to a clique produces positive or negative development. In one 4-year study of 451 children from age nine to twelve, Miranda Witvliet along with Pol A. C. van Lier, Mara Brendgen, Hans M. Koot, and Frank Vitaro examined longitudinal associations between clique membership status and internalizing and externalizing problems during late childhood. In this quasi-experiment the researchers aimed to discover if clique membership status was linked to increases in children's psychopathology. Children from five different elementary schools in northwestern Quebec, Canada were the participants of this particular study. In the study, clique membership status was identified through social network analysis, and peer nominations were used to assess internalizing and externalizing problems. The study used the program Kliquefinder to identify clique membership status through social network analysis. Through use of behavioural descriptions on the Pupil Evaluation Inventory (PEI), peer nominations of externalizing and internalizing behaviors were obtained.

Through this study, Witvliet, van Lier, Brendgen, Koot, and Vitaro noted that externalizing problems increased among clique members. They found that clique members compared with isolated children showed, on average, an increase in externalizing problems across that same period. While no sex differences were found in the link between clique membership status and internalizing problems, the association found between clique membership and an increase in externalizing problems was specific to boys only. The researchers claimed that these results support the hypothesis that clique membership protects children against developing internalizing problems.

== Decline of cliques ==
During middle adolescence, the social norms that once enforced sex cleavage shift to encourage mixed-sex socialization. Single-sex cliques begin to seek out the company of opposite-sex cliques, although at first almost all direct interaction remains within the individual cliques despite the presence of the other clique(s). Gradually, intersex relationships and mixed sex cliques develop, closely followed by the first romantic relationships, which typically appear among early-pubertal, high-status, more physically developed adolescents. Over the course of late adolescence romantic relationships replace clique hierarchies as the most potent determinants of social status and networks of dating couples eventually replace more rigidly structured cliques.

The chronological relationship between changing gender dynamics and the dissolution of organized, hierarchical cliques is well-established, but not fully understood. One theory asserts that sex cleavage both arises and wanes because cliques are largely sorted by common interests: girls and boys are generally interested in different activities until dating emerges, after which they share a highly valued activity.(164) This idea is consistent with the direct relationship between pubertal development and the appearance of other-sex friends. One possible explanation for this progression argues that children are socialized from childhood to conform to gender roles and during early adolescence cognitive developments promote active self-presentation and anxiety over peer-perceptions; as a result, early adolescents become more consciously aware of both the benefits of conventional gender identity and the threat of ridicule or rejection in response to unorthodox behavior. According to this framework, gender segregation subsides because the same inculcated gender roles that prompt children to distance themselves from anything associated with the opposite sex also encourage adolescents and adults to demonstrate heterosexual desire and sexual/seductive competence. This argument explains the drastic shift in the targets of ridicule from those who were too androgynous in middle school to those who can not or do not attract sexual attention in high school.

The effects of such social enforcement of gender-roles, may take the form of relational aggression, bullying, and gay bullying.

== Implications ==
Perhaps the most consequential finding from the empirical study of adolescent cliques is that they are not an inherently negative force, but rather part of normative development in our society. Although it is certainly true that certain cliques can negatively influence development, others can actually benefit adolescents. In cases in which clique influence is negative, it is encouraging to note that while most forms of interventions are fairly ineffective and peer group interventions frequently produce iatrogenic effects, interventions with parents have yielded encouraging results.

== See also ==
- Adolescence
- Cabal
- Clique
- Collusion
- Crowds (adolescence)
- Youth subculture
- Relational aggression
- Bullying
- Juvenile delinquency
- Simmelian tie
