= Relational aggression =

Damaging social interaction

Relational aggression, alternative aggression, or relational bullying is a type of aggression in which harm is caused by damaging someone's relationships or social status.

Although it can be used in many contexts and among different age groups, relational aggression among adolescents in particular, has received a lot of attention.

The attention relational aggression has received has been augmented by the help of popular media, including movies like Mean Girls and books like Odd Girl Out by Rachel Simmons (2002), Nesthäkchen and the World War by Else Ury (1916), and Queen Bees and Wannabes by R. Wiseman (2003).

Relational aggression can have various lifelong consequences. Relational aggression has been primarily observed and studied among girls, following pioneering research by psychologist Nicki R. Crick.

== Overview ==
A person's peers become increasingly significant in adolescence and are especially important for adolescents' healthy psychological development. Peers provide many new behavioral models and feedback that are essential for successful identity formation and for the development of one's sense of self. Interactions with peers encourage positive practice of autonomy and independent decision-making skills. They are also essential for healthy sexual development including the development of the capacity for intimate friendships and learning appropriate sexual behavior. Peer relationships are also very important for determining how much adolescents value school, how much effort they put into it, and how well they perform in class. However, quite frequently adolescents take part in peer relationships that are harmful for their psychological development. Adolescents tend to form various cliques and belong to different crowds based on their activity interests, music and clothing preferences, as well as their cultural or ethnic background. Such groups differ in their sociometric or popularity status, which often create unhealthy, aggression-victimization based dynamics between groups. Different forms of aggression can also be used to control dynamics and sociometric status within a group. Sometimes aggression is directed to an individual rather than to any apparent social group. Primary reasons for victimization include looks and speech; adolescents are also frequently bullied because of a disability, particular ethnicity, or religion.

=== Definition ===
Relational aggression is defined as a type of aggression that is "intended to harm others through deliberate manipulation of their social standing and relationships". Relational aggression, according to Daniel Olweus is a type of bullying. Bullying in general, is defined as physically or psychologically violent re-occurring and not provoked power. These key conditions apply to all types of bullying:

== Types ==
Relational aggression may be either covert or direct, and is distinct from other forms of indirect aggression. It can be proactive (planned and goal-oriented) or reactive (in response to perceived threats, hostility, or anger), and it can be, for instance, peer-directed or romantic. Several studies have indicated substantive differences between proactive and reactive relational aggression. Reactive aggression is associated with a tendency to assume that others' intentions are hostile (hostile attribution bias).

Most studies of relational aggression have involved children or adolescents; the study of relational aggression in adults presents problems. Relational aggression is a common aspect of workplace bullying, and is a characteristic behaviour of psychopaths in the workplace, so it is commonplace amongst adults as well as children.

== Manifestations ==
Manifestations of relational aggression include:

- Excluding others from social activities.
- Damaging victim's reputations with others by spreading rumors and gossiping about the victim, or humiliating them in front of others.
- Withdrawing attention and friendship.

Psychological manipulation and coercion can also be considered as a type of relational aggression.

Most recent research has been focusing on cyberbullying, which is a relatively new yet increasingly popular way of engaging in both verbal and relational aggression due to growing importance of various communication and technology devices in modern societies. Some studies show that internet meanness is more common among girls than boys.

== Prevalence ==
Many studies in the U.S. and Europe show that at least 30% of students report having been bullied in one or another way. Some studies indicate even higher percentages of victimization. Bullying in schools happens in all forms and at various ages, although peer bullying has the highest prevalence in 6th–8th grades. The most common forms of bullying are verbal with relational, or various forms of ostracism, coming in second.

=== Gender differences ===
Although it can be used by both genders, relational aggression is more commonly associated with girls. Findings of a study by Rivers and Smith have shown that while verbal aggression occurs with similar frequency in both sexes, direct physical aggression is more common among boys and indirect aggression is more common among girls. In another study by Baldry it was found that boys are more likely to engage in bullying behaviors such as threats, physical harm, rejection, and name-calling, while girls are most likely to use name-calling, teasing, rumors, rejection, and taking personal belongings. Based on these findings, girls do seem to use relational aggression more than boys.

In addition, recent international research shows that both genders tend to use relational aggression, but girls are more aware and distressed by it. For example, a study by Horn found that girls are more likely to say that it is morally wrong to exclude someone based on their crowd membership.

Some research shows that there are certain implications when boys and girls engage in gender-atypical aggression, as girls who are more physically aggressive or boys who are highly relationally aggressive are more maladjusted than their peers.

== Sociometric status ==
Sociometric status, commonly referred as popularity, is one of the most significant predictors of victimization or bullying as differences in popularity can be associated with differences in social power. It is commonly believed that aggressive adolescents belong to rejected social groups. However, some research shows that they can be popular among their peers. Rodkin et al. (2000), for example, describes two types of popular boys: "model" boys, who are "physically and academically competent, friendly and neither shy nor aggressive." Second type is described as "tough" and such adolescents are "aggressive, physically competent, and average or below average in friendliness, academic competence, and shyness." Usually the more popular aggressive adolescents use instrumental aggression and not reactive aggression. Instrumental aggression is defined as behavior that is deliberate and planned while reactive aggression is unplanned and impulsive. Relational aggression can be greatly instrumental for maintaining the popularity status of a group among other groups, as well as specific relationship and status dynamics inside a group. Ojala and Nesdale (2004) found that both victims and bullies normally come from rejected groups. Bullies choose to bully students who are members of their social out-groups that are similar to their own in-group as a result of threatened distinctiveness. Hence, the need to maintain a unique social identity and status can be one of the causes to engage in bullying. Using relational aggression to maintain a particular social order inside the group has been mostly observed in girl groups: if some member of the group becomes too popular and this causes imbalance in the group, other members might start rumors about the overly popular girl to diminish her status. Amanda Rose (2004) claims that the main purpose of using relational aggression in first place is to enhance or maintain one's social status. Many skills that are needed to be popular are also essential for being "successful" at employing relational aggression, e.g. ability to "read" people and adjust one's behavior accordingly, etc. The researcher suggests that some aggressive boys are popular because they are also good at using relational aggression, and, therefore, their primary reason for popularity is not their physical but relational aggression.

== Different participation roles ==
Research shows that there are three types of rejected or unpopular adolescents who are very likely to be involved in bullying behavior. First type includes adolescents who are overly aggressive: they tend to get into fights, get involved in antisocial activities, and are often involved in bullying; second type includes adolescents who are withdrawn or timid and exceedingly shy and inhibited and who are more likely to be victims; third aggressive-withdrawn-type adolescents tend to have trouble controlling their hostility, but they are also very shy and nervous about initiating friendships. The latter are likely to be bully-victims. Other students- bystanders can also choose between several roles: victim-defender, bully-reinforcer or assistant, and outsiders.

=== Victims ===
Victims or the unpopular withdrawn children are excessively anxious, lack social skills needed to initiate new contacts or break into a group activity. Their lack of confidence combined with submissiveness make them perfect targets for bullying. Some of the most common underlying reasons for bullying include low socioeconomic status, disability, and obesity. Research shows that in comparison with other adolescents victims often use worse problem solving strategies. They often score less than their bullies and defenders in the tests of moral competence and theory of mind. Moral competence refers to the ability to carefully consider both the consequences and prior beliefs in determining how morally right or wrong one's actions are. Victims seemed to focus primarily on the outcomes and not being as good in integrating the moral beliefs. They have difficulties in social skills, and social problem solving, as well as emotional regulation. And because of their lack of social competence, victims score low on peer acceptance and popularity. Victims are often overly sensitive to being rejected, which might originate in their relationships with parents.

=== Bullies ===
Bullies, despite being quite morally competent, tend to engage in morally wrong behaviors because of several reasons, including a lack of moral compassion. In general, bullies seem to engage in a kind of cold cognition and have a good theory of mind. They also have an average to good social intelligence. These skills seem to be especially important in order to use relational aggression in an instrumental manner—for achieving specific social goals. As mentioned previously, male and female bullies usually score differently on sociometric measures. Male bullies often fall in the socially rejected category while female bullies tend to fall in the controversial category. They can be popular yet not liked.

==== Hostile attributional bias ====
Many unpopular aggressive kids seem to engage in hostile attributional bias when analyzing the actions of others: they are more likely to interpret other children's behavior as hostile while it is not, which can cause the perpetuation of their aggressive behaviors.

=== Bully-victims ===
Bully-victims are people who have both experienced aggression directed towards them and have themselves engaged in bullying. They often choose to be bully assistants or reinforcers. Seeing others victimized can serve as a buffer against some psychological problems, for which these people are at risk (see consequences of victimization below). In comparison to all other groups, bully-victims are the worst off regarding their psychological adjustment and problems. They are least liked among the peers.

=== Bystanders ===
A bystander is a person who observes a prejudiced attack towards another person and chooses to ignore it. Although early research has mostly focused on victims and bullies, currently more and more attention has been given to the roles of other students, or bystanders: bully-reinforcer's and assistants, victim-defenders, and outsiders. Bullying is something that occurs when there is an audience and some even assume that bullying would completely stop if no one was watching. Bystanders are a lot more likely to help when they know the victim or the victim is a woman.

==== Bully-reinforcers and assistants ====
Bully-reinforcers and assistants do not normally initiate aggressive actions themselves, but they support, reinforce, and assist the bully. They often have rather large friendship networks when compared to outsiders, victims, and their defenders. These individuals are similar to bullies in regards of their personal characteristics. Female bully-reinforcers and assistants usually score low on social acceptance and high on rejection by their peers while male bully assistants have average scores on both and bully-reinforcers are often quite popular among their peers. The characteristic that is common among all these individuals across both genders is low level of empathy.

==== Victim-defenders ====
Victim-defenders are individuals who stand up for the victim. They are usually popular among their peers, although occasionally rejected and victimized adolescents take on the defender's role. Defenders like to befriend other defenders and usually belong to the smallest social network of all other previously mentioned groups. Defenders have both advanced moral competence and high level of compassion. They also score high on the theory of mind tests. They are usually very morally engaged, have a high sense of responsibility, and self-efficacy. They are also good at emotion regulation.

==== Outsiders ====
Outsiders are adolescents who like to stay away from the conflict situations, participate in spreading rumors, or actively support either side. They usually befriend other outsiders. Both male and female outsiders usually score below average on both social acceptance and rejection by their peers. In general, the best predictor for whether an adolescent will choose to be a defender or an outsider in a particular situation is their relationship to the victim or bully. Occasionally, adolescents will feel more comfortable to intervene if they are friends of the offender. However, in general they will take the side of the bully or victim based on who they know better. Bullies are more likely to be friends of other bullies, as well as their reinforcers, and assistants, while victims befriend other victims.

== Consequences of victimization ==
There are serious negative consequences associated with being involved in any aggressive behaviors. And while problems with peers might be a result of one's poor social skills and maladjustment, difficulty making friends, and regular experience of aggression can also be a cause of many short and long term negative consequences on one's mental health and academic and professional achievements. Experience of relational aggression, peer rejection, and unpopularity are shown to be linked to various problems in adolescence, which are listed below:

- depression;
- behavioral problems;
- poor social skills;
- lack of close peer relationships;
- difficulties in academic performance;
- low school engagement;
- undermined feelings of competence;
- low self-esteem;
- occasionally distress due to victimization can also result in physical symptoms such as bed wetting, abdominal pain, and headaches.

Some negative effects persist into adulthood. A systematic review of 42 peer-reviewed studies found consistent associations between relational aggression victimization and depression, anxiety, PTSD symptoms, disordered eating, and interpersonal difficulties extending into adulthood. In a longitudinal study, Dan Olweus (2003) found that young adults, who were victims of bullying in adolescence, had more symptoms of depression and lower self-esteem than did their non-victimized peers. Victims are also much more likely to engage in heavy smoking later in life. Decreased academic engagement due to victimization can have some long term consequences as victim's lower educational attainment in adulthood leads to lower earnings.

=== Differences in consequences of victimization for victims and bully-victims ===
There are differences in consequences among the children who are rejected and aggressive, also known as bully-victims, and children who are rejected and withdrawn, also referred to as simply victims. Aggressive individuals often have conduct problems and are involved in antisocial activity. Withdrawn children feel exceedingly lonely, at risk of low self-esteem, depression, and diminished social competence. Adolescents who are both aggressive and withdrawn are at greatest risk for various mental and behavioral problems.

=== Suicide ideation and attempts ===
Although victims respond to bullying in various ways, some of the most common ways include avoidance or escape behaviors, such as not going to school and running away from home. However, in some extreme cases, suicide attempts might occur. Compared to non-victims, victims exhibit increased levels of suicidal ideation. and are more likely to have attempted suicide. Researcher Y.S. Kim (2005) found that there are some gender differences as victimized female but not male students were at significantly greater risk for suicidal ideation. Further research has shown that increased risk for suicidal ideation and attempts depend on a specific interaction between gender, frequency, and type of aggression. Relational or indirect aggression was found to be associated with depression and suicidal ideation among both genders. According to Brustein and Klomek (2007), victimization at any frequency increased the risk of depression, ideation, and attempts among girls, while only frequent victimization increased the risk of depression and ideation among males; yet, Katliala-Heino et al. (1999) found that severe ideation was associated with frequent victimization only among girls.

== Environmental buffers and prevention programs ==
Some adolescents are more resilient to victimization due to their personal characteristics, but there are some environmental factors such as having a best friend or great family support can decrease the risk for many negative consequences associated with victimization. In addition, research shows that support from teachers can be a significant environmental factor for higher academic achievement and school engagement. It can also increase general well-being in the classroom. Teacher attitudes towards bullying were found to moderate the extent to which victims internalize and feel distressed and express it by avoiding school and similar behavior. Close teacher-student relationship moderates perceived safety in the classroom, and higher perceived safety is directly linked to better classroom concentration and improved coping strategies. Therefore, supportive friends, family, and teachers can be great buffers for victimized students against all negative effects of victimization. Witnessing the harassment of others can also reduce some harmful effects of being victimized: victims-only feel more humiliated and angry than victims-witnesses on the same day. Being singled out and picked on feels worse than being one of many victimized students. This explains why in ethnically diverse schools victimized students experience worse psychological outcomes when their ethnic group is in majority, because then they are more likely to attribute it to their personal shortcomings and not to their group membership.

=== Prevention programs ===
There are many prevention programs, which have been designed to improve social skills of the unpopular and victimized adolescents. Prevention programs usually focus on one of the three strategies:

1. teaching social skills like self-expression, leadership, and questioning of others about themselves;
2. have unpopular adolescents participate in group activities together with the popular adolescents under supervision of psychologists;
3. some programs focus on training on how to combine and use one's cognitive and behavioral abilities, including social problem solving.

Different types of programs have shown to have somewhat different effects: the first type seems to best improve adolescent's ability to get along with others while the second type has shown to improve adolescents' self-conceptions and their acceptance by others. One of the examples of the programs using the third approach is PATHS (Promoting Alternative Thinking Strategies) teaches skills needed for successfully analyzing social situations, controlling one's negative emotions, and making more rational social decisions. It has been shown to successfully reduce behavioral problems among elementary school children. However, it is difficult to prevent relational aggression from happening as often adolescents who use it are seen to be more popular among their peers.

== See also ==
- Abusive power and control
- Adolescence
- Bullying
- Character assassination
- Clique
- Crowds (adolescence)
- Cyber-bullying
- Mobbing
- Peer victimization
- Physical abuse
- Psychological abuse
- Psychological trauma
- Relational disorder
- Shunning
- Social exclusion
