= Peer victimization =

Harassment or bullying amongst members of peer groups

Peer victimization is harassment or bullying that occurs among members of the same peer group. It is often used to describe the experience among children or young people of being a target of the aggressive and abusive behavior of other children, who are not siblings and not necessarily age-mates.

== Background/overview ==
Mass interest in the issue of peer victimization arose during the 1990s due to media coverage of student suicides, peer beatings, and school shootings, notably the tragedy in Columbine, Colorado. This led to an explosion of research attempting to assess bully-victim relationships and related players, what leads victims to experience negative outcomes and how widespread this problem was. Studies of peer victimization have also been conducted in the context of research investigating childhood relationships in general and how they are associated with school adjustment and achievement.

Research has proven the problematic nature of peer victimization, identifying many negative outcomes such as low self-esteem, low school engagement, school avoidance, lower school achievement, learned helplessness, and depression. Peer victimization is especially prevalent and damaging in middle school, as during this time children are defining themselves by creating self-schemas and establishing self-esteem, both which will impact their future adult life; for this reason, most of the research on peer victimization focuses on this age group. They are also more vulnerable to peer rejection because needs for belonging and intimacy may be especially strong during early adolescence when children are working to solidify their peer groups.

Much of victimization research adopts a social psychology perspective, investigating how different types of peer victimization affect the individual and the different negative outcomes that occur. Some experimenters are adopting the term social victimization in order to acknowledge that victimization can take both verbal and nonverbal forms or be direct or indirect. They mostly focus on the types of victimization that can occur from multiple sources in a particular environment. Personality psychologists look at individual differences and effects in victims. They may also study individuals in a social context, determining which are more likely to be victimized, such as those who are socially withdrawn.

With the development of technology and the widespread access it gives to children and teenagers, peer victimization has become more prevalent through the Internet and cell phones than in years past. This form of victimization called cyberbullying has the potential for a much wider audience than traditional face-to-face victimization. It is also easier to hide from parents and teachers. Studies have found that because this form of victimization is done through the anonymity of the Internet or text messaging, bullies feel more comfortable being crueler to the victim. Without face-to-face communication, social standards become less important and behavior becomes less inhibited.

== Major theoretical approaches ==
=== Operational definitions ===
Originally, researchers focused on overt forms of victimization, which were categorized as either physical or verbal. Later, researchers such as Nicki R. Crick argued for the existence of a more covert form of victimization which she observed primarily among females that she called relational victimization, during which a child's social relationships and social standing are attacked via methods such as peer exclusion. Today, victimization is largely operationally defined as either covert/relational victimization or overt/physical victimization, in which a child is threatened with or dealt corporeal damage.

=== Research approaches and theories ===
The study of peer victimization draws from two major strands of research as identified by Seely, Tombari, Bennett & Dunkle (2009) called the "bullying strand" and the "peer relationship strand." The victimization aspect of the "bullying strand" focuses on what leads victims to disengage from school and suffer from damaging negative outcomes while others adjust. The peer relationship strand is more quantitatively oriented, studying fundamental factors related to peer victimization and the negative outcomes, paying special attention to what factors mediate the relationship between them. Interest in peer victimization in psychological research has been fairly recent, and therefore it appears that most researchers have drawn from other areas of study and contemporary applied theories to the context of peer victimization.

The areas of the bullying strand that specifically pertain to peer victimization are studies of victimization prevalence, victims’ home environment, and effects of victimization in schools. Researchers started by determining the prevalence of peer victimization believing this would allow for the comparison of the problem over time, populations and after interventions. Prevalence research has been conducted in many different countries, cultures and classroom contexts. Studies utilize a variety of different methods such as self-report questionnaires, peer nominations, and teacher nominations have been used. Unfortunately, results show that in many contexts, the percentage of children that are victimized have fallen in a range between 5-90% Bullying strand research also focuses on the type of families that those who are victimized come from and what types of parenting styles they experienced Finally, a limited number of studies today focus on impacts of being bullied in a school setting and how it relates to achievement, truancy, and drop-out.

Studies examining peer victimization have also been conducted in the context of a body of research interested in peer relationships and how they affect educational performance and adjustment; this is identified as the "peer relationship strand." In the 1970s and 1980s, Steven Asher identified one form of a relationship—peer victimization—as a predictor of educational maladjustment. Later, a new perspective formed that considered peer victimization as a type of relationship existing on a continuum of relationship roles from healthy relations to detrimental ones instead of focusing on specific bully-victim relationships. Experimenters have also been interested in how early victimization effects individuals over time, focusing on school-related outcomes. Studies have largely worked to identify underlying factors that mediate negative outcomes.

To account for the difference in the severity of negative outcomes as a result of peer victimization, researchers have utilized theories of implicit peer relationships. In order to understand the social world, individuals create implicit theories about their social interactions A major determinant of how a person handles social evaluation is the degree to which they ascribe entity theories of personality, believing it their attributes are stable and unalterable or incremental theories of personality, viewing attributes as pliable able to be augmented Those who adopt entity theories of personality often pursue performance oriented goals, seeking to accrue positive and avoid negative evaluations of their competence. Since they view their attributes as constant, it is vital that they are desirable in order for them to maintain a positive self-image. People who hold incremental theories of personality endeavor towards mastery-oriented goals, focusing on learning and cultivating competence since as they believe their attributes are malleable. Accordingly, they should feel less threatened by others’ evaluations of their competence. When thinking about self-evaluation, implicit theories should affect the degree to which children base their self appraisals on peer judgements, determining whether negative social interactions undermine their well-being.

In regards to behavioral reactions to victimization, research has identified two categories of characteristic responses. One contains externalizing behaviors such as aggression, disruptive, antisocial, and acting out behaviors (Achenbach, 1966). Another constitutes internalizing behaviors like inhibited, anxiety, or heightened withdrawal.

Hawker and Boulton (2001) have used the rank theory of depression to explain the relationship between forms of victimization and types of maladjustment. According to the rank theory, internalizing problems such as depression are linked to a sense of powerlessness and of not belonging. Those who are physically victimized suffer from low resource-holding potential, which works in part to delineate social power in peer groups, while relational victimization directly affects children's sense of belonging instead.

Currently, researchers have become interested in the direction of the relationship between peer victimization and psychosocial adjustment. Many believe that the relation acts in a single direction: either peer victimization leads to maladjustment, or the relationship is reversed Some argue that the relationship is a bidirectional and causal relationship. As studies on the topic have generally utilized, cross-sectional research designs, a definitive answer has not been reached.

== Empirical findings ==
A study by Cole, Maxwell, Dukewich & Yosick examined how physical and relational Targeted Peer Victimization (TPV) victimization were related and measured their effects on different types of positive and negative cognitions. It was hypothesized that the link between peer victimization and depression was mediated by the creation of negative self-schemas. The study found gender differences in victimization, as Relational TPV was more common for girls and physical TPV was more common for boys. Also, children who were severely victimized exhibited less positive self-cognitions and more negative self-cognitions as well as more depressive symptoms. Yet when they controlled for the effects of relational TPV, the effects of physical TPV disappeared; it appears that relational TPV is more strongly associated with these outcomes and an investigation of physical TPV alone would not yield the same associations. Positive and negative self-cognitions were found to mediate the effect of relational victimization to symptoms of depression.

Another study by Sinclair (2011) examined the relationship between physical and relational peer victimization with negative and positive self-cognitions as well. It was found that both types of victimization led to increases in negative self-cognitions and decreases in positive self-cognitions, though the effects were more pronounced when a child experienced relational victimization. While girls were found experienced more relational victimization than boys did and boys experienced more physical victimization than girls did, the negative effects of victimization on self-cognitions was stronger in boys. This may be due to one of their findings that boys are less likely to seek adult social support than girls are. A study conducted by Schmidt and Bagwell used surveys to gauge the reactions of victimization and their self evaluated friendships. The study found that girls benefited significantly from having stronger, reliable peer friendships in coping with victimization, while boys did not. A study by Snyder and colleagues studied 266 Kindergarten and first grade children in cases of observed victimization at school. The researchers hypothesized that children with higher recorded cases of victimization during recess would rank higher in antisocial and depressive behavior—according to parents and teachers—than those who do not. Results showed that girls were not as affected by boys in terms of their change in teacher and parent rated behavior whereas boys were heavily influenced by the amount of peer victimization that day.

Research seems to show that there is drastic difference in the way both genders (at least in children) respond to victimization from peers. Current studies on children indicate that regardless of observational method (researcher direct observation or survey results given to the children) there is a marked effect of victimization, especially from peers. The magnitude of the effect on their behavior and mental health is heavily correlated with the situation of the victimization and the child's social environment at the time.

Schwartz et al. (1998) investigated the role of victimization in the development of children's behavior problems, focusing on both internalizing and externalizing problems. They hypothesized that higher levels of victimization would lead to increased level of behavioral problems. Child behavior was reported by teachers and parents, measured using the Child Behavior Checklist, and peer victimization was measured using peer nomination. Indeed, they found that peer victimization in middle childhood was associated with behavioral maladjustment on both a concurrent and prospective basis. Additionally, externalizing behaviors were more strongly associated with victimization than were internalizing behaviors.

Seals & Young (2003) investigated relationships between bullying and victimization with gender, grade level, ethnicity, self-esteem, and depression. Results showed that victims reported lower levels of self-esteem than did bullies and nonbullies/nonvictims. Additionally, victims had the highest depression scores as compared to bullies and nonbullies/nonvictims.

Research progress has also been made into recent mediums of victimization and bullying, notably online victimization. A study conducted by Mitchell et al. in 2007 collected data from over 2000 adolescents through telephone interviews. The most surprising finding was that those who reported being subject to online victimization in the past year are 96% likely to also report being subject to physical (offline) victimization. Another study conducted with over 3000 youth in the 5th, 8th and 11th grades using surveys concluded that Internet victimization shares common causal pathways with physical and verbal victimization.

== Controversy ==
An interest in aspects of bullying sprouted in the 1990s due to media coverage of student suicides, peer beatings, and school shootings. Yet such negative outcomes are rare.

One of the most well-known cases concerning the effects of peer victimization is the Columbine High School massacre of 1999 in Columbine, Colorado, United States. The perpetrators of this incident, Eric Harris and Dylan Klebold, murdered 12 students and 1 teacher and also injured 21 other students before committing suicide. After the tragedy, details emerged showing that Harris and Klebold had been bullied for years by classmates, with little to no intervention by school officials. Though such events are not frequent, they do alarming damage.

There has been a recent surge in the number of incidents regarding peer victimization and homosexuality. Specifically, the news has recently highlighted many cases of lesbian, gay, bisexual and transgender (LGBT) students who have committed suicide in response to peer victimization. One such incident is the case of 18-year-old Tyler Clementi, a Rutgers University student who was secretly videotaped by his roommate, Dharun Ravi, having sexual intercourse with another man. Ravi and another hallmate also streamed the video of the sexual encounter online. After finding out about this, Clementi jumped off of the George Washington Bridge to his death.

Research demonstrates that lesbian, gay, or bisexual (LGB) students are highly likely to be victimized. Over half of LGB participants were verbally abused when they were in high school, and 11% were physically assaulted in a study by D’Augelli et al. (2002). Negative outcomes such as mental health problems and poor school performance have been associated with high incidence of victimization of LGB students. Recently research in this area seems to be progressing from the investigation of the extent and effects of LGB victimization to the specific factors associated with victimization and negative outcomes.

A study by Goodenow et al. (2006) was one of the first to examine which school-related factors were associated with lower rates of victimization and suicidality in this population. School related factors included the presence of LGB support groups and staff support as well as other school characteristics like student-to-teacher ratio. It was found that LGB support groups were associated with both low victimization and suicidality among LGB students. Results indicated that the existence of LGB support groups may have led to a decrease in suicidality through decreasing incidence of peer victimization as the association between LGB support groups and suicidality disappeared when victimization was controlled for. Yet as this study examined correlations, causality cannot be assumed. Student courts were associated with less victimization, and antibullying policies were associated with less suicidality, even when the effects of victimization and perceived support were taken into account. Lower levels of victimization and suicidality of LGB students was also associated with large school size and urban locale. These school-related factors have traditionally been associated with a generally safer school environment, yet it seems that factors that increase safety for the general population may not increase safety for LGB students.

A study by Kosciw et al. (2009) investigated how school related factors, community factors (such as adult education and income level), and locational factors (on a national level) were associated with victimization of LGB students. Results showed that community factors were the most significantly related to victimization and many regional-level as well as school-related factors were not found to be significant once these factors were taken into account. Increased reports of victimization due to gender expression were found in communities with higher poverty levels compared to affluent communities. Youth from communities with higher as opposed to lower proportions of adults with college degrees also reported less victimization. In accordance with the Goodenow study, It was also found that youth from urban communities were less likely to be victimized than those from rural communities.

== Applications ==
The results of these studies show a strong need for intervention programs, specifically in-school programs. Though most schools punish bullying through disciplinary action, the frequency of bullying and victimization remains high. Thus, newer, more effective strategies must be implemented. Such programs should not only focus on punishing the bully, but should also focus on the victim. Victims should be taught to use healthier coping strategies instead of internalizing and externalizing their feelings. One intervention program focuses on bullying prevention in positive behavior support (BP-PBS). BP-PBS is designed to, in a series of steps, teach students how to treat each other respectfully, as well as teach ways to minimize social reinforcement of bullying behaviors in order to improve the school atmosphere.

Ross and Horner (2009) investigated the effectiveness of this program across three elementary schools in Oregon by focusing on 6 students. They collected baseline data for the frequency of bullying as well as victim and bystander responses and then implemented the program across these school for approximately 8–12 weeks. Results showed that the frequency of bullying behaviors was significantly reduced among these students and that there was also a significant increase in more appropriate responses from victims and bystanders. Thus, interventions like BP-PBS may be effective in alleviating the problem of bullying and victimization in schools. To really test this, such programs should be put into effect nationally. Effective counseling are also a necessary component of dealing with peer victimization in schools. The most important step to successful counseling is identifying the children who are being victimized. While physical victimization can be easily noticed, for example by the presence of bruises and scratches, relational victimization is harder to detect. It is difficult to realize what children are being ostracized or ridiculed, especially if the student does not vocalize this treatment. Disciplining relational victimization is also a difficult task. Whereas physical victimization is usually punished with a school suspension, for example, it would seem ridiculous to respond to relational victimization with the same punishment. Because of such discrepancies, it is important to create and implement effective strategies for dealing with relational victimization.

== Trivia ==
In a study evaluating the effectiveness of this program, Bauer, Lozano, & Rivara (2007) found that the Olweus program had "mixed positive effects"; specifically, there was a 28% decrease in relational victimization and a 37% decrease in physical victimization.

== See also ==
- Bullying
- Bullying and emotional intelligence
- Cyberbullying
- Gay bashing
- Victimization
