= Unpopularity =

Opposite of popularity

Unpopularity is the opposite of popularity. Therefore, it is the quality of lacking acceptance or approval by one's peers or society as a whole.

== Early development ==
The importance of peer relations in an adolescent's normal psychosocial development has been well-researched. The impact of peers is hardly surprising, given that high school students spend the majority of their days with peers rather than with adults, both during and outside of class. More importantly, peer groups provide contexts separate from the home for experimentation. This makes peers particularly crucial in the development of a sense of identity and a capacity for intimacy.

But while normal peer relations are an enjoyable alternative to the home, a subset of adolescents experiences this social network as distinctly unpleasant. These adolescents are considered unpopular or deviant even early in childhood, and are rejected as such. In adolescence, they are uncharacteristic of any crowd and lack the close friendships of their more popular peers. There has been considerable research documenting the effects of peer rejection, such as low academic achievement, delinquent behavior, and mental health problems in adulthood. Other research has focused on identifying stable subgroups of unpopular adolescents. A common distinction is that made between aggressive, withdrawn, and aggressive–withdrawn individuals.

However, less is known about how these traits lead to aggressive or withdrawn children to become unpopular and to experience later adjustment problems. Indeed, the very causality of this relationship is uncertain, and it is suggested that both behavioral traits and unpopularity are as stable as they are due to various reinforcement processes. Because peer relations are so essential to developing identity and intimacy, the normal psychosocial maturation of unpopular adolescents lags behind their peers. Attempts to "catch up" by reentry into the dominant network of peer groups are then likely to fail and result in even greater rejection. In seeking to compensate for the lack of peer relations, furthermore, the unpopular adolescent may be forced to turn to other sources of support that cannot replace the peer group and may, in fact, encourage the adolescent's unpopular traits. Indeed, unpopular adolescents may be unable to achieve a genuine sense either of identity or intimacy either in their initial peer relations, or in their attempted compensation involving family members, antisocial contacts, or fantasy.

=== Types of unpopularity ===
==== Neglected ====
Children who are neglected are not actively rejected by their peers, they are simply ignored. Usually, the neglected child does not enjoy being at school, but the long-term harm does not necessarily result. The child does the best at rebounding from this neglect if they have "a supportive family and outstanding talent (eg., in music or the arts)" to use as a support system from which to move on.

==== Aggressive-rejected ====
Aggressive-rejected children are unpopular because, as the name would suggest, are aggressive and confrontational towards others. This type of unpopularity can result in psychological harm to the rejected child and an "increased risk of depression and uncontrolled anger over the years of middle childhood"

Children who are categorized as being aggressive-rejected are the children who are likely to become bully victims: People who are attacked or harassed, who then go and attack or harass someone else. They are victims who then become bullies.

==== Withdrawn-rejected ====
Withdrawn-rejected children are rejected by their peers because they are "timid and anxious." This type of unpopularity can also result in psychological harm to the rejected child and give them an "increased risk of depression and uncontrolled anger over the years of middle childhood"

=== Emergence in interaction with traditional peer groups ===
To understand the stability of peer rejection, it is first necessary to trace unpopularity back to the original interactions between future antisocial adolescents and their popular peers. Rubin, Chen, McDougall, Bowker, and McKinnon examined the predictability of both withdrawal and aggression. The researchers argued that early social withdrawal as well as aggression can preclude unpopular children from normal levels of social and emotional competence. At the time their study began, withdrawal (often confused with shyness) was not generally considered to predict maladjustment in adolescence and adulthood. Rather than make specific hypotheses, then, the study's aim was to confirm that withdrawn as well as aggressive children suffer from more adolescent maladaptations than popular peers, and also to show that the particular social and emotional problems of each of the two groups are unique.

The study, called the Waterloo Longitudinal Project, followed a group of 88 mostly middle-class male and female children from grade 2 (average age 7 years) to grade 9 (age 14). As a result of attrition, only 60 of the subjects remained in the study for the full seven years. The main independent variable in the study was a classification of second-grade children by social type. To differentiate between the aggressive, withdrawn, and socially competent second-grade children, the researchers constructed aggregates of several measures. On one scale, the Revised Class Play method pioneered by Masten, Morison, and Pellegrini, children were asked to nominate peers who best fit into each of the three social categories. Three of the seven items designed to measure isolation were deleted, however, because they seemed to record peer rejection rather than withdrawal, and in two cases (e.g. "someone who has trouble making friends") were as applicable to aggressive children as to their withdrawn peers—underscoring the tendency of the two groups of unpopular children to overlap. Other indicators added to the aggregate measures of aggression, withdrawal, and social competence were a peer-assessed sociometric rating of each child's popularity, teacher ratings, and observations by the researchers during 15-minute play sessions. The dependent measures consisted of questionnaire items regarding each ninth-grade adolescent's delinquency and substance abuse, perceived security in both family and peer groups, loneliness, and self-regard.

In their analysis, Rubin et al. performed a regression analysis to determine the relative importance of each of the second-grade social categories in predicting "externalizing" outcomes (such as delinquency and substance abuse) and "internalizing" outcomes (insecurity, loneliness, and low self-regard). Aggression was found to be the only significant predictor of ninth-grade delinquency, while social withdrawal was a significant predictor of negative self-regard, loneliness, and felt peer-group insecurity. Aggression thus predicted only externalizing outcomes, and withdrawal only internalizing outcomes. No significant interaction was found between the two forms of unpopularity, suggesting that relatively "pure" samples of aggressive and withdrawn children had indeed been isolated. Social competence, meanwhile, was predictive of substance use (and of feeling peer-group insecurity, though to a lesser extent than withdrawal). The researchers conjectured that this externalizing outcome might be indicative of natural experimentation rather than unchecked abuse of drugs (which might indeed be associated with peer rejection).

The results of this study support the idea that both social withdrawal and aggression lead to maladaptations later in adolescence, and that these difficulties are different for each type. In particular, the association between withdrawal and negative internalizing behavior was confirmed. In fact, Hymel, Rubin, Rowden, and LeMare, in an earlier assessment of the same longitudinal sample, note that the relatively high attrition in the population selected against children viewed as more isolated and less socially competent, suggesting that the difficulties experienced by withdrawn children could be even more severe than indicated. This research, as well as the earlier analysis of the sample, attests to the stability of both forms of unpopularity.

It is likely that the mechanisms that emerge to sustain withdrawal and aggression share some similarities. Both traits may begin as an interaction between a child's relationships and disposition either to be wary or to act out. If these tendencies are sustained, the child is rejected by peers. This precludes the development of social skills comparable to those of their peers, and unpopular children, withdrawn as well as aggressive, may come to be seen as deviant. For withdrawn adolescents, internalized problems are expressed as insecurity and hesitancy, which elicits increasingly strong rejection. Aggressive adolescents while worrying less about their relations with others, have deficits in social information processing, which may lead these adolescents to falsely attribute hostile motives to their peers. Not surprisingly, such adolescents evoke feelings of anger, fear, and frustration from their peers, which can also lead to increasing rejection. Thus while withdrawal causally meshes with hindered self-esteem, aggression is part of a reinforcing interplay with hampered impression formation.

=== Support and reinforcement by family members ===
The very problems experienced by unpopular adolescents in self-concepts and friendships demonstrate that they, like all adolescents, require refinement of their identity and capacity for intimacy. Faced with the rejection of more popular peers, however, they must turn to other sources for support in this development—even if, according to Weiss's widely accepted the principle, different relationships normally provide children with different forms of social support. One possible compensation is the adolescent's family, and in particular sibling relationships. For children in general, Furman and Buhrmester found some resemblance among sibling and friend relationships: both provide a sense of closeness, companionship, and shared experiences. Indeed, sibling relationships might have the advantages of being more familiar and enduring, making rejection of either withdrawal or aggressive tendencies less likely.

A study by East and Rook tested the compensation value of sibling relationships among unpopular early adolescents. Specifically, the researchers hypothesized that peer-rejected children would have less supportive school friendships than more average peers and that while such children would have more social and emotional problems they would also derive more support from a peer alternative, alleviating their difficulties. The peer alternative could be either a sibling or a nonschool friend. The study drew from a group of 450 sixth-grade subjects (average age 12), who again were mostly middle class male and female students who had received parental consent to participate. Unlike Rubin et al.'s longitudinal study, East and Rook used a cross-sectional design. Although this avoided any attrition problems, a selection was still possible: 35% of the parents of eligible adolescents declined to allow their children to participate, for largely unstated reasons.

As in Rubin et al.'s research, the students were divided by social category—in this case, isolated, peer-aggressive, and average—on the basis on peer nomination on Masten, Morison, and Pellegrini's Revised Class Play measure. An attempt was again made to isolate relatively "pure" samples in each category, by classifying only those with a high score on aggression items and a low score on isolation items as "aggressive" and those with the opposite pattern as "isolated." The second independent variable was social support from school friends, nonschool friends, and siblings. The subjects were asked to choose the closest or most important person from each category and rate them on a series of items. These items measured different forms of support (e.g. companionship), which were also combined into an overall support level. High support and low support conditions were created using a median split to divide the higher and lower support scores. Children who did not have a sibling or a nonschool friend, or who did not clearly fit into the isolated, aggressive, or average social categories were screened out, leaving 200 subjects in the study. The dependent variables in the study were self-report scales measuring loneliness, depression, and general self-worth, and parent and teacher checklists with items measuring anxiety and immaturity–passivity.

Whereas East and Rook had hypothesized that, compared to their average peers, both isolated and aggressive adolescents would perceive their school friendships as less supportive, only the friendships of isolated subjects were significantly less so. Reliably lower-than-average scores were found in four dimensions of support: companionship, enhancement of the worth, instrumental help, and intimacy. Furthermore, the results indicate that isolated but not aggressive adolescents perceived their favorite sibling relationship as more supportive than did their average peers. This was true for support in general as well as on the same four dimensions listed above. Isolated adolescents also appeared to be more maladjusted than average subjects, registering as lonely and depressed, with aggressive adolescents suffering an intermediary level of difficulties. Both unpopular groups were rated as anxious by teachers and as immature by fathers and teachers. But only the isolated group appeared to benefit from having high-support sibling relationships. Isolated adolescents with high support had significantly less teacher- and father-assessed anxiety and less teacher-assessed immaturity than those with low support. Aggressive adolescents with relatively high sibling support, however, actually gained in father-rated anxiety. Neither unpopular group gained sufficiently from their sibling bond to reduce their maladjustment difficulties to the level of average adolescents. The only category-specific effect of nonschool friendships, finally, was an increase in self-perceived aggression among highly supported aggressive adolescents.

For isolated children, East and Rook's results do confirm the hypothesis that sibling relationships compensate to some extent for unsupportive school friendships. This was particularly true in the areas of companionship, enhancement of the worth, instrumental help, and intimacy support, and in the reduction of adjustment problems such as immaturity and anxiety. However, the study also showed that even high sibling support did not come with a full reduction of maladjustment. In fact, the authors even suggest that high support bonds could increase an adolescent's peer rejection, by decreasing motivation to associate with other adolescents. In any case, it is difficult to see how any family relationship, while providing intimacy and companionship, could entirely replace peer relations. Peer groups appear to play a unique role in developing an identity, through mechanisms such as shared activities and feedback. The problems of withdrawn adolescents—who correspond roughly to the isolated subjects in this study—seemed in Rubin et al.'s research to involve weak self-image, suggesting that these individuals are in particular need of identity support.

East and Rook acknowledge that the similarity observed between the friendship patterns of aggressive and average children was surprising. One possible reason for the inability to differentiate the two groups was that most of the measures (e.g. loneliness, anxiety) measured internalizing problems, which Rubin et al. showed to be characteristic of withdrawn children. But the findings could also be taken to suggest that aggressive adolescents do not generally find compensation from sibling relationships. This may be related to the established connection between problem families and the aggressive trait. Families with relatively more neglect or abuse may not present any truly supportive relationships. Consistent with this is East and Rook's finding that the only effect of a sibling bond perceived as high in support was to increase an aggressive adolescent's anxiety.

=== Support and reinforcement by antisocial contacts ===
For those adolescents who fail to find even incomplete compensation for their unpopularity from siblings, another avenue for support may be other rejected adolescents. Research on this compensation mechanism typically focuses on relationships between "antisocial" peers, which (in contrast with sibling bonds) seem to select for the aggressive form of unpopularity, rather than the withdrawn form. In one investigation, Dishion, Patterson, Stoolmiller and Skinner tried to determine which factors among a late preadolescent's behavior, school and family environments predicted adolescent involvement with antisocial peers. Their Oregon Youth Study was, like Rubin et al.'s project, a longitudinal study, combining the results from two cohorts separated by a lag of 1 year. The researchers hypothesized that while experiences both in school and with parents would have an effect of antisocial involvement, only the school experiences (school failure and peer rejection) would predict growing involvement with antisocial peers (family experiences co-occurring with continual antisocial involvement).

The 206 subjects in this study, unlike the samples of Rubin et al. and East and Rook, were typically lower class, from neighborhoods with high rates of delinquency, and exclusively males, who typically have higher rates of problem behaviors than females. These selections served to focus on externalizing behaviors typical of aggressive adolescents. Attrition was only 3%, much lower than in Rubin et al.'s study, probably because of the shorter length of the research and the screening out of all families who intended to move from the area between assessments. The sample was tested both in fourth grade (age 10) and in sixth grade (age 12). Self-selection may still have occurred as in the East and Rook study, with only 74.4% of eligible families agreeing to participate. However, Dishion et al. were able to compare teacher-assessed levels of problem measures among the participating and nonparticipating groups and found no significant difference.

This study again used a battery of subject, peer, parent, and teacher tests, and aggregated them to increase cross-situational consistency. Based on the sociometric ratings of their peers, the grade 10 children were classified as rejected, controversial, neglected, average, or popular. The rejected and neglected children both had negative social preference scores, but only the rejected children had a high social impact. These social classes may correspond roughly to aggressive and withdrawn children. Other independent predictors included the children's academic skill (combining the results of several tests and teacher ratings), parental discipline (based on researcher observations of aversion and punishment), parental monitoring (based on scores assigned during parent and subject interviews), and antisocial behavior and involvement with antisocial peers (aggregates of parent, teacher, and subject ratings). The only dependent measure was involvement with antisocial peers, again an aggregate measure.

Dishion et al.'s results confirmed the link between unpopularity and later peer antisocial behavior. Children classified as rejected had significantly higher levels of antisocial contact than both average and popular children. This was true both of those rejected boys who had earlier antisocial contacts and those with a normal level of earlier involvement. Neglected children had the next highest level of antisocial contact, suggesting (insofar as neglect and withdrawal co-occur) that more withdrawn children also turn to unpopular peers, though less to the point of delinquency. The results also showed a strong correlation between both harsh parental discipline and lack of monitoring and antisocial associations in the sixth grade. Consistent with the researchers' hypothesis, however, a multivariate test showed that stable levels of antisocial involvement and poor parenting co-occurred; only academic skills and popularity were able to account for significant increases in antisocial contacts. This suggests that for many boys, maladaptive family relations are a factor in chronic aggression and unpopularity.

Dishion et al. also conjectured that both academic failure and unpopularity may be involved in self-reinforcing relationships with antisocial involvement. Boys with poor academic skills may group together (or be grouped together, in schools using tracking), as may socially rejected children. Such groups would be more tolerant of aggressive behaviors, and would not reinforce the social skills already weak in each child. This is comparable to the tolerant but non-challenging nature that may characterize sibling bonds. But while sibling relationships provided intimacy but hindered normal identity development, the antisocial relationships of more aggressive adolescents helped give them identity but not intimacy. Such contacts gave the boys positive feedback and shared activities, even if these encouraged further delinquent behavior. Research by others, meanwhile, has attested to the lack of real friendship in these contacts. For instance, Pabon, Rodriguez, and Gurin found that while relationships among delinquent adolescents involved considerable shared time, they did not involve emotional closeness or gratification. In particular, the adolescents characterized their peers as not willing to listen to their problems. While peers normally play a central role in intimacy development, providing a context for equality-based friendships, the peers of aggressive unpopular adolescents are distant and may even reinforce these individuals' antisocial tendencies.

=== Support and reinforcement by use of fantasy ===
A final arena which antisocial adolescents may turn to for identity and intimacy development is within themselves. This area of compensation is less well-researched than the relationships with siblings or antisocial peers, but several studies have shown that individuals who might be classified as unpopular in childhood are more likely to develop an orientation towards fantasy later in life. Such "fantasy-prone personalities" include traits such as frequent fantasizing, hypnotizability, and the capacity for vivid hallucinations and even out-of-body experiences. A study by Rhue and Lynn not only tested the construct validity of such a personality but also tried to precisely identify the early life experiences which direct the development of fantasy proneness. In particular, three kinds of early experiences were tested: encouragement to fantasize from a significant adult, high levels of involvement in artistic activities, and isolating or aversive environments. Each of these routes was thought to lead to a more fantasy-prone personality.

The subjects of Rhue and Lynn's study were 59 college students, both male and female, presumably in late adolescence or young adulthood. Students identified as extremely high, medium, and extremely low fantasy prone based on their initial scores on Wilson and Barber's test were selected from a larger population of students. The study used a cross-sectional design, but unlike that of East and Rook, this experiment gauged childhood experience from retrospective accounts. Although this left open the possibility of fabricated reports (particularly for the fantasy-prone person), the researchers stressed to the subjects they need for objectivity and honesty. Dependent measures in the study included written and oral interviews that asked for recollection on items related to each of the three pathways to fantasy proneness identified by the investigators.

The first two pathways received relatively little confirmation. The role of parental encouragement to read books (not necessarily fantasy-oriented) was significantly related to later high fantasy proneness, but early parental reading or encouragement to imagine things did not. Childhood activity in artistic pursuits did not distinguish high, medium, or low fantasy-prone. The final route—negative childhood environments—did receive support, however. High fantasy-prone were much more likely than the other subjects to report having enjoyed playing alone and playing imaginary games, and not playing with friends. This group was also more likely than the low fantasy prone to report having felt lonely as children. High fantasy proneness was also associated with an aversive environment. Such subjects reported significantly more frequent, severe, and unjustified physical punishment than comparison groups, both in middle and late childhood. High fantasy-prone subjects described using imagination to block the pain of punishment and thinking of revenge more often than the other subjects.

In their discussion of these results, Rhue and Lynn suggested that there were two kinds of negative environments that could lead to fantasy proneness. One was characterized by punishment, and the other (though less well represented in this study) by encouragement. In support of this distinction, the researchers noted that there was no relationship between parental punishment and support. Punishing and encouraging home environments may correspond generally to the backgrounds of aggressive and withdrawn adolescents, respectively. While withdrawn children often find support within the family structure, as East and Rook found, Dishion et al. found that aggressive children are more likely to have abusive and neglectful parents.

For both types of children, fantasy may serve a compensatory function. For withdrawn and lonely children, fantasy might provide a more positive self-image and even introduce imaginary peers, typically of equal age and gender who could be a source of intimate friendship? For aggressive and punished children, fantasy had a more escapist role, giving the child a forum in which vengeful thoughts were permitted and pain was forgotten. As with the other forms of compensation described earlier, however, fantasy probably provides only limited compensation as the child ages. The withdrawn adolescent's imaginary friends may not be able to support the experimentation inherent in the formation of identity, and escapism may hinder the aggressive adolescent from developing mature and intimate relationships. High fantasy-prone people also suffer from other problems, such as occasional problems in reality monitoring and possibly increased likelihood of schizophrenia.

=== Summary ===
Although the mechanisms may be different for withdrawn and aggressive children, it appears that unpopular adolescents are indeed caught in a variety of vicious cycles wherever they turn for identity or intimacy support. More popular peers, rather than involving them in contexts conducive to experimentation or relationships based on equality, reject those they view as withdrawn or aggressive. This isolation only serves to reinforce internalized feelings of low self-worth and loneliness in withdrawn adolescents, and externalized behaviors such as delinquency in aggressive adolescents. While withdrawn individuals may find some measure of support in sibling relationships, this support may sustain internalizing difficulties like anxiety and may discourage these adolescents from experimenting with their identity. Aggressive adolescents, who often experience their family as abusive and neglectful, are more likely to turn to other antisocial peers for support. These relationships while providing shared activities outside of the home may further externalize problems like delinquency while discouraging the normal formation of emotionally involving relationships. Both types of rejected adolescents may also turn to fantasy for compensation, but again may not derive from it the form of support they most critically need. Withdrawn individuals are not given a forum for identity experimentation, and aggressive adolescents fail to develop mature interpersonal skills.

== Intervention ==
These findings underscore the need for intervention treatment for unpopular adolescents, which could step into these reinforcing cycles and raise the adolescent to a more advanced level of psychosocial development. Treatments should be administered early and be tailored to the specific behavioral trait exhibited by children. Withdrawn children would benefit from programs involving supervised participation in group activities, which have been shown to raise self-esteem. Aggressive children would benefit from programs that encourage social problem solving, which encourage correct perceptions of social situations. In fact, intervention programs could benefit both aggressive and withdrawn children simultaneously, since bullies and their victims (who are both likely to draw from the population of rejected children) can even reinforce each other.
