= Nicki R. Crick =

Psychologist and professor of child development

- Born: February 6, 1958; West Lafayette, Indiana
- Died: October 28, 2012 Age 54; Woodbury, Minnesota
- Education: Purdue University, Vanderbilt University
- Occupations: Distinguished Professor of Psychology, University of Minnesota

Nicki Rae Crick (February 6, 1958 – October 28, 2012) was a psychologist and professor of child development and family studies known internationally for her research on relational aggression, defined as the use of relationships as agents of harm (e.g., via gossiping, social exclusion, withdrawing affection). At the time of her death, she held the position of Distinguished McKnight University Professor and Irving B. Harris Professor of Child Psychology at the Institute of Child Development, University of Minnesota.

Crick received prestigious awards for her contributions as a scientist, including the American Psychological Association Award for Distinguished Early Career Contributions to Psychology in 2002 and the Boyd McCandless Award from APA Division 7 (Developmental Psychology) in 1995. She was a Fellow of the Association for Psychological Science and the American Psychological Association (Division 7).

== Education and teaching ==
Crick received her B.A./B.S. degree in psychology and a master's degree in human development and family studies at Purdue University. She obtained her Ph.D. in Clinical Psychology in 1992 from Vanderbilt University, where she studied under the supervision of Kenneth Dodge. After graduating, she joined the faculty of the Department of Psychology at the University of Illinois at Urbana–Champaign. In 1996, Crick moved to the University of Minnesota, where she served on the faculty of the Institute of Child Development.

== Research ==
Crick's research career aimed to promote positive youth development. In her work on peer victimization, Crick observed that forms of peer maltreatment that were common in boys' peer groups tended to occur much less frequently in girls' peer groups, and concluded that girls were more often relationally victimized, whereas boys were more overtly victimized. Crick published a number of influential articles on peer victimization including "An observational study of delivered and received aggression, gender, and social-psychological adjustment in preschool: "This White Crayon Doesn't Work ...".

Crick's work on childhood aggression demonstrated that, as a group, boys are more physically aggressive than girls. Her study hypothesized that this finding reflects a lack of research on forms of aggression that are relevant to girls rather than an actual gender difference in levels of overall aggressiveness. The form of aggression hypothesized to be typical of girls, relational aggression, was assessed with a peer nomination instrument in third- through sixth-grade children. Results provided evidence for the validity and distinctiveness of the construct of relational aggression, defined as acts intended to harm others through deliberate manipulation of their social standing and relationships. In addition to finding that girls tended to be more relationally aggressive than boys, she found evidence that relationally aggressive children were at risk for serious adjustment difficulties.

Crick's innovative research on relational aggression examined behaviors involving social exclusion or spreading malicious rumors. The research showed that girls are more likely to engage in relational forms of aggression than the physical forms of aggression that had previously captured the majority of empirical attention. Crick's research documented the harmful consequence of relation aggression for victims and perpetrators, which forced aggression researchers to expand their studies of aggressions to include a wider range of aggressive behaviors. At heart, she was an astute methodologist who took risks to develop reliable and reasonable measures. Her combination of theoretical and methodological intensity essentially changed the way that people study aggression today.

== Death ==
Crick died on October 28, 2012, at the age of 54 from cancer.

== Representative publications ==
- Cicchetti, D., & Crick, N. R. (Eds.). (2009). Precursors of and diverse pathways to personality disorder in children and adolescents: Part 1 [Special Issue]. Development and Psychopathology, 21, 683–1030.
- Crick, N. R., Casas, J. F., & Ku, H.-C. (1999). Relational and physical forms of peer victimization in preschool. Developmental Psychology, 35, 376–385.
- Crick, N. R., & Dodge, K. A. (1994). A review and reformulation of social information-processing mechanisms in children's social adjustment. Psychological Bulletin, 115(1), 74–101.
- Crick, N. R., & Grotpeter, J. K. (1995). Relational aggression, gender, and social-psychological adjustment. Child Development, 66(3), 710–722.
