= Popularity =

Concept in sociology

In sociology, popularity is how much a person, idea, place, item or other concept is either liked or accorded status by other people. Liking can be due to reciprocal liking, interpersonal attraction, and similar factors. Social status can be due to dominance, superiority, and similar factors. For example, a kind person may be considered likable and therefore more popular than another person, and a wealthy person may be considered superior and therefore more popular than another person.

There are two primary types of interpersonal popularity: perceived and sociometric. Perceived popularity is measured by asking people who the most popular or socially important people in their social group are. Sociometric popularity is measured by objectively measuring the number of connections a person has to others in the group. A person can have high perceived popularity without having high sociometric popularity, and vice versa.

According to psychologist Tessa Lansu at the Radboud University Nijmegen, "Popularity [has] to do with being the middle point of a group and having influence on it."

== Introduction ==
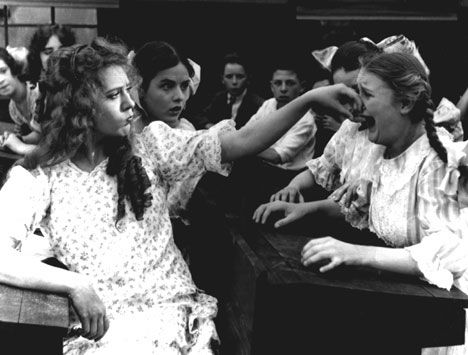
From the 1917 silent film Rebecca of Sunnybrook Farm, this image shows one girl behaving with overt aggression towards another girl.

The term popularity is borrowed from the Latin term popularis, which originally meant "common." The current definition of the word popular, the "fact or condition of being well liked by the people", was first seen in 1601.

While popularity is a trait often ascribed to an individual, it is an inherently social phenomenon and thus can only be understood in the context of groups of people. Popularity is a collective perception, and individuals report the consensus of a group's feelings towards an individual or object when rating popularity. It takes a group of people to like something, so the more that people advocate for something or claim that someone is best liked, the more attention it will get, and the more popular it will be deemed.

Notwithstanding the above, popularity as a concept can be applied, assigned, or directed towards objects such as songs, movies, websites, activities, soaps, foods etc. Together, these objects collectively make up popular culture, or the consensus of mainstream preferences in society. In essence, anything, human or non-human, can be deemed popular.

== Types of interpersonal popularity ==
For many years, popularity research focused on a definition of popularity that was based on being "well liked." Eventually, it was discovered that those who are perceived as popular are not necessarily the most well liked as originally assumed. When students are given the opportunity to freely elect those they like most and those they perceive as popular, a discrepancy often emerges. This is evidence that there are two main forms of personal popularity that social psychology recognizes, sociometric popularity and perceived popularity. Prinstein distinguishes between the two types as likeability vs. social status.

=== Sociometric popularity or likeability ===
Sociometric popularity can be defined by how liked an individual is. This liking is correlated with prosocial behaviours. Those who act in prosocial ways are likely to be deemed sociometrically popular. Often they are known for their interpersonal abilities, their empathy for others, and their willingness to cooperate non-aggressively. This is a more private judgement, characterized by likability, that will not generally be shared in a group setting. Often, it is impossible to know whom individuals find popular on this scale unless confidentiality is ensured.

=== Perceived popularity or social status ===
Perceived popularity is used to describe those individuals who are known among their peers as being popular. Unlike sociometric popularity, perceived popularity is often associated with aggression and dominance and is not dependent on prosocial behaviors. This form of popularity is often explored by the popular media. Notable works dealing with perceived popularity include Mean Girls, Odd Girl Out, and Ferris Bueller's Day Off. Individuals who have perceived popularity are often highly socially visible and frequently emulated but rarely liked. Since perceived popularity is a measure of visible reputation and emulation, this form of popularity is most openly discussed, agreed upon within a group, and what most people refer to when they call someone popular.

== Comprehensive theories ==
To date, only one comprehensive theory of interpersonal popularity has been proposed: that of A. L. Freedman in the book Popularity Explained. The 3 Factor Model proposed attempts to reconcile the two concepts of sociometric and perceived popularity by combining them orthogonally and providing distinct definitions for each. In doing so, it reconciles the counter intuitive fact that liking does not guarantee perceived popularity nor does perceived popularity guarantee being well liked.

=== "Popularity Explained" ===
Popularity Explained was first published as a blog before being converted to a book and various versions have been available online since 2013.

==== Conceptual foundations ====
There are four primary concepts that Popularity Explained relies on.

1. Liking and attraction are not the same. The interpersonal feeling of "liking" is not the same as "attraction" and that both are responsible for different human behaviours. The neurological evidence of this comes from the research of Kent C. Berridge and his incentive salience model. Popularity Explained extrapolates the conclusions of this research and applies it to human-human interpersonal interactions.
2. A hierarchy of interpersonal attraction exists in all social groups. Popularity Explained develops a very broad definition of interpersonal attraction asserting that it is based on a multitude of different factors but primarily those of: socioeconomic status; interpersonal similarity; physical appearance; and efficacy. It proposes the concept of a "Hierarchy of Attraction" which, in simple terms, is just a stylized bell curve that illustrates how attractive people are relative to each other in terms of a percentile.
3. Interpersonal attraction (in the broadest sense) results in Input of Energy. Input of Energy is the interpersonal actions that an individual takes, consciously and unconsciously, when they experience an interpersonal attraction. Examples of Input of Energy given in the book include: attempts at physical proximity; changes in verbal communications; changes to non-verbal communication; biased interpersonal judgments; cognitive intrusion; and helping behaviour.
4. Sociometric and perceived popularity are correlated but not equivalent. By combining these two concepts, Popularity Explained defines eight prototypical student types that can be plotted on the single graph.

==== Three-factor model ====
According to Freedman, an individual's place in the social landscape is determined by a combination of three factors: what they are; who they are; and the situation.

1. What refers to all those aspects of a person that are objective: participation in sports, physical appearance, etc. Perceived popularity is primarily the result of what a person is. It is mediated by Input of Energy combining with the Hierarchy of Attraction. This preferential receipt of Input of Energy by a select few is what propels them to the "popular" side of the graph that combines sociometric and perceived popularity.
2. Who refers to the personality of the individual and how they treat other people. It is this factor that is responsible for determining where a student sits along the "liking" and "disliking" dimensions that characterize a student. The more pro-social an individual, the more they will be liked.
3. The Situation refers to the circumstances that an individual finds themself in. Different circumstances may result in different social outcomes. For example, the same student may be perceived as popular when in the social context of their church youth group but unpopular within the social context of their school as a whole.

== Interpersonal causes ==
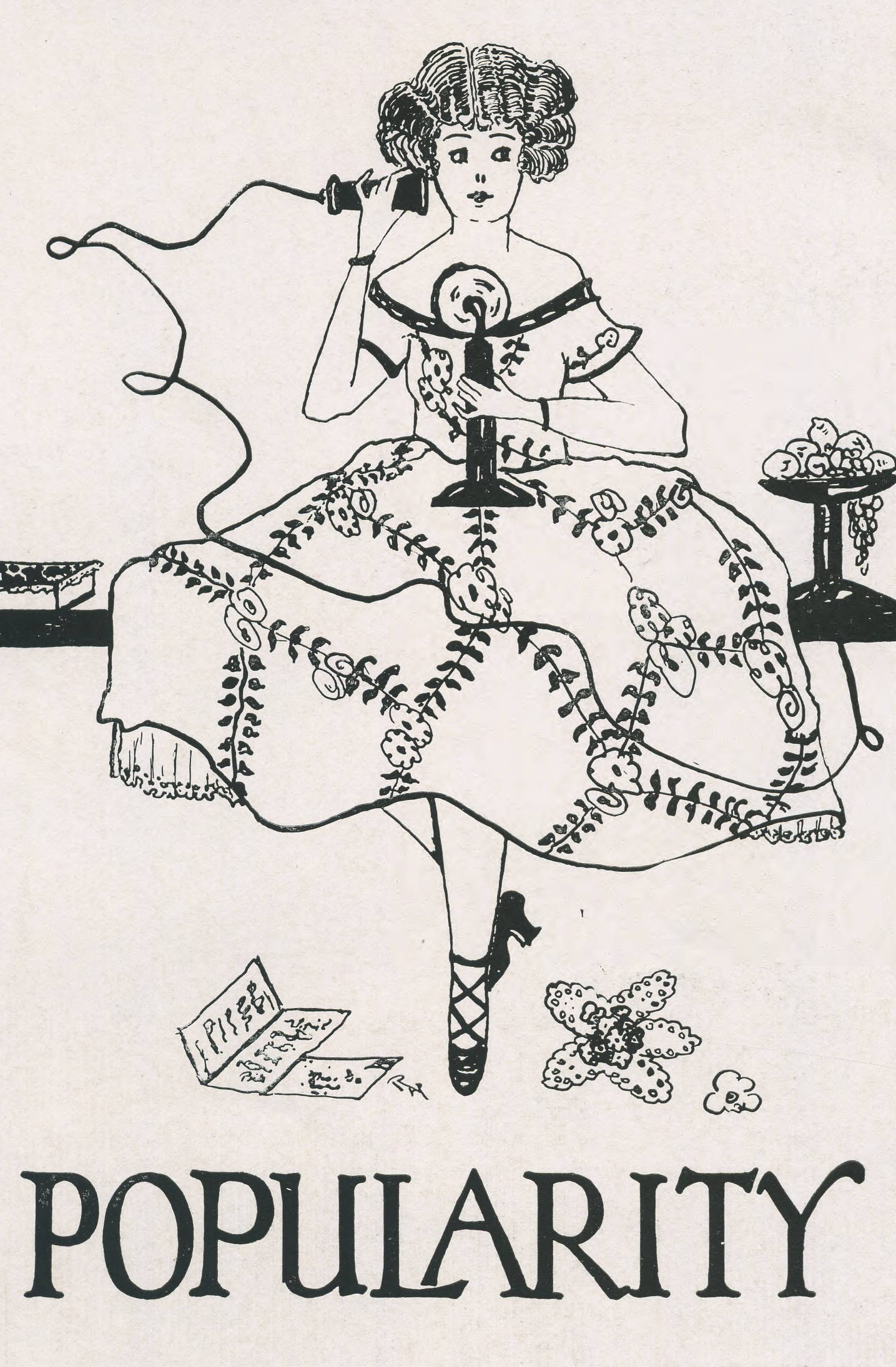
"Popularity" artwork featured in East Texas State Normal College's 1922 Locust yearbook

One of the most widely agreed upon theories about what leads to an increased level of popularity for an individual is the perceived value which that individual brings to the group. This seems to be true for members of all groups, but is especially demonstrable in groups that exist for a specific purpose. For example, sports teams exist with the goal of being successful in competitions against other sports teams. Study groups exist so that the members of the group can mutually benefit from one another's academic knowledge. In these situations, leaders often emerge because other members of the group perceive them as adding a lot of value to the group as a whole. On a sports team, this means that the best players are usually elected captain and in study groups people might be more inclined to like an individual who has a lot of knowledge to share. It has been argued that this may be a result of our evolutionary tendencies to favor individuals who are most likely to aid in our own survival.

The actual value which an individual brings to a group is not of consequence in determining his or her popularity; the only thing that is important is his or her value as perceived by the other members of the group. While perceived value and actual value may often overlap, this is not a requisite and it has been shown that there are instances in which an individual's actual value is relatively low, but they are perceived as highly valuable nevertheless.

=== Attractiveness ===
Attractiveness, specifically physical attractiveness, has been shown to have very profound effects on popularity. People who are physically attractive are more likely to be thought of as possessing positive traits. People who are attractive are expected to perform better on tasks and are more likely to be trusted. Additionally, they are judged to possess many other positive traits such as mental health, intelligence, social awareness, and dominance.

Additionally, people who are of above average attractiveness are assumed to also be of above average value to the group. Research shows that attractive people are often perceived to have many positive traits based on nothing other than their looks, regardless of how accurate these perceptions are. This phenomenon is known as the Halo effect This means that, in addition to being more well-liked, attractive people are more likely to be seen as bringing actual value to the group, even when they may be of little or no value at all. In essence, physically attractive people are given the benefit of the doubt while less attractive individuals must prove that they are bringing value to the group. It has been shown empirically that being physically attractive is correlated with both sociometric and perceived popularity. Some possible explanations for this include increased social visibility and an increased level of tolerance for aggressive, social interactions that may increase perceived popularity.

=== Aggression ===
The degree to which an individual is perceived as popular is often highly correlated with the level of aggression with which that individual interacts with his or her peers. There are two main categories of aggression, relational and overt, both of which have varying consequences for popularity depending on several factors, such as the gender and attractiveness of the aggressor.

The relationship also depends on culture. Prinstein notes that studies have found that increased aggression tends to correlate with higher social status in the United States, but lower social status in China.

==== Relational aggression ====
Relational aggression is nonviolent aggression that is emotionally damaging to another individual. Examples of relationally aggressive activities include ignoring or excluding an individual from a group, delivering personal insults to another person, and the spreading of rumors. Relational aggression is more frequently used by females than males.

It has been found that relational aggression almost always has a strongly negative relationship with sociometric popularity but can have a positive relationship with perceived popularity depending on the perceived level of attractiveness of the aggressor. For an aggressor who is perceived as unattractive, relational aggression, by both males and females, leads to less perceived popularity. For an attractive aggressor however, relational aggression has been found to actually have a positive relationship with perceived popularity.

The relationship between attractiveness and aggression is further intertwined by the finding that increased levels of physical attractiveness actually further decreased the sociometric popularity of relationally aggressive individuals.

In short, the more physically attractive an individual is, the more likely they are to experience decreased levels of sociometric popularity but increased levels of perceived popularity for engaging in relationally aggressive activities.

==== Overt aggression ====
Overt aggression is aggression that involves individuals physically interacting with each other in acts such as pushing, hitting, kicking or otherwise causing physical harm or submission in the other person. This includes threats of violence and physical intimidation as well.

It has been shown that overt aggression directly leads to perceived popularity when the aggressor is attractive. Experiments that are controlled for levels of physical attractiveness show that individuals who are attractive and overtly aggressive have a higher degree of perceived popularity than attractive non-overtly aggressive individuals. This was found to be true to a small degree for females and a large degree for males.

Attractive individuals who are overtly aggressive barely suffer any consequences in terms of sociometric popularity. This is a key difference between overt and relational aggression because relational aggression has a strongly negative relationship on sociometric popularity, especially for attractive individuals. For unattractive individuals, there is again a strongly negative relationship between overt aggression and sociometric popularity. This means that attractive individuals stand to gain a lot of perceived popularity at the cost of very little sociometric popularity by being overtly aggressive while unattractive individuals stand to gain very little perceived popularity from acts of overt aggression but will be heavily penalized with regards to sociometric popularity.

=== Cultural factors ===
According to Talcott Parsons, as rewritten by Fons Trompenaars, there are four main types of culture, marked by:

- love/hate (Middle East, Mediterranean, Latin America);
- approval/criticism (United Kingdom, Canada, Scandinavia, Germanic countries);
- esteem/contempt (Japan, Eastern Asia); and
- responsiveness/rejection (the United States).

Only the responsiveness/rejection culture results in teenagers actively trying to become popular. There is no effort for popularity in Northern or Southern Europe, Latin America or Asia. This emotional bonding is specific for the high schools in the United States. In the love/hate cultures, the family and close friends are more important than popularity. In the approval/criticism cultures, actions are more important than persons, so no strong links develop during school.

=== Demographic differences ===
==== Maturity ====
Popularity is gauged primarily through social status. Because of the importance of social status, peers play the primary role in social decision making so that individuals can increase the chances that others like them. However, as children, individuals tend to do this through friendship, academics, and interpersonal conduct. By adulthood, work and romantic relationships become much more important. This peer functioning and gaining popularity is a key player in increasing interest in social networks and groups in the workplace. To succeed in such a work environment, adults then place popularity as a higher priority than any other goal, even romance.

==== Gender ====
These two types of popularity, perceived popularity and sociometric popularity, are more correlated for girls than they are for boys. However, it is said that men can possess these qualities to a larger extent, making them more likely to be a leader, more powerful, and more central in a group, but also more likely than women to be socially excluded. Boys tend to become popular based on athletic ability, coolness, toughness, and interpersonal skills; however, the more popular a boy gets, the worse he tends to do on his academic work. On the other hand, this negative view of academics is not seen at all in popular girls, who gain popularity based on family background (primarily socioeconomic status), physical appearance, and social ability. Boys are also known to be more competitive and rule focused, whereas girls have more emotional intimacy.

==== Race ====
In some instances, it has been found that in predominantly white high schools, attractive non-white students are on average significantly more sociometrically popular than equally attractive white students. One theory that has been put forth to explain this phenomenon is a high degree of group cohesiveness among minority students compared with the relative lack of cohesion amongst members of the majority. Since there is more cohesion, there is more availability for one person to be liked by many since they are all in contact. This acts like Zipf's law, where the cohesion is a confounding factor that forces the greater links in the smaller minority, causing them to be more noticed and thus more popular. When considering race as a predictor for perceived popularity by asking a class how popular and important each other person is, African American students were rated most popular by their peers. Popularity in race was found to be correlated with athleticism, and because African Americans have a stereotype of being better at sports than individuals of other races, they are viewed as more popular. Additionally, White and Hispanic children were rated as more popular the better they succeeded in school and came from a higher socioeconomic background. No single factor can explain popularity, but instead the interaction between many factors such as race and athleticism vs. academics.

== Effects of popularity in the workplace ==
=== Importance ===
More tasks in the workplace are being done in teams, leading to a greater need of people to seek and feel social approval. In academic settings, a high social standing among peers is associated with positive academic outcomes. Popularity also leads to students in academic environments to receive more help, have more positive relationships and stereotypes, and be more approached by peers. While this is the research found in schools, it is likely to be generalized to a workplace.

=== Benefits ===
Popularity is positively linked to job satisfaction, individual job performance, and group performance. The popular worker, besides just feeling more satisfied with his job, feels more secure, believes he has better working conditions, trusts his supervisor, and possesses more positive opportunities for communication with both management and co-workers, causing a greater feeling of responsibility and belongingness at work. Others prefer to work with popular individuals, most notably in manual labor jobs because, although they might not be the most knowledgeable for the job, they are approachable, willing to help, cooperative in group work, and are more likely to treat their coworkers as an equal. If an employee feels good-natured, genial, but not overly independent, more people will say that they most prefer to work with that employee.

=== Contributing factors ===
According to the mere-exposure effect, employees in more central positions that must relate to many others throughout the day, such as a manager, are more likely to be considered popular. There are many characteristics that contribute to popularity:

- Expressing and acting in genuine ways – others will turn away if they can detect that someone is being fake to them
- Focusing on positive energy – others will feel too drained to be around someone if their interactions are not started on a positive note or they don't have empathy to share in someone else's positive news
- Treating others with respect – others do not like to be around someone if they aren't treated equally and acknowledged for their hard work
- Create connections – others are more likely to approach individuals they have strong relationships with; these can be built by talking about more personal issues, attending work gatherings, and communicating outside the office walls
- Patience – turning away too quickly ignores that relationships take time to grow, especially in the busy and stressful environments that work often induces
- Incorporating others – others feel a sense of trust and belongingness when they are asked for help on a project
- Hands-on or servant leader – is a person that will do the work before anyone else, be the first to do the less desirable jobs, and have a positive attitude about it.

=== Leadership popularity ===
With a greater focus on groups in the workplace, it is essential that leaders effectively deal with and mediate groups to avoid clashing. Sometimes a leader does not need to be popular to be effective, but there are a few characteristics that can help a leader be more accepted and better liked by his group. Without group or team cohesiveness, there is no correlation between leadership and popularity; however, when a group is cohesive, the higher up someone is in the leadership hierarchy, the more popular they are for two reasons. First, a cohesive group feels more personal responsibility for their work, thus placing more value on better performance. Cohesive members see leaders as taking a bulk of the work and investing a lot of personal time, so when they see a job's value they can ascribe its success to the leader. This greatest contribution principle is perceived as a great asset to the team, and members view the leader more favorably and he gains popularity. Secondly, cohesive groups have well established group values. Leaders can become more popular in these groups by realizing and acting on dominant group values. Supporting group morals and standards leads to high positive valuation from the group, leading to popularity.

== The popularity of objects as a consequence of social influence ==
=== Information cascades ===
Popularity is a term widely applicable to the modern era thanks primarily to social networking technology. Being "liked" has been taken to a completely different level on ubiquitous sites such as Facebook.

Popularity is a social phenomenon but it can also be ascribed to objects that people interact with. Collective attention is the only way to make something popular, and information cascades play a large role in rapid rises in something's popularity. Rankings for things in popular culture, like movies and music, often do not reflect the public's taste, but rather the taste of the first few buyers because social influence plays a large role in determining what is popular and what is not through an information cascade.

Information cascades have strong influence causing individuals to imitate the actions of others, whether or not they are in agreement. For example, when downloading music, people don't decide 100% independently which songs to buy. Often they are influenced by charts depicting which songs are already trending. Since people rely on what those before them do, one can manipulate what becomes popular among the public by manipulating a website's download rankings. Experts paid to predict sales often fail but not because they are bad at their jobs; instead, it is because they cannot control the information cascade that ensues after first exposure by consumers. Music is again, an excellent example. Good songs rarely perform poorly on the charts and poor songs rarely perform very well, but there is tremendous variance that still makes predicting the popularity of any one song very difficult.

Experts can determine if a product will sell in the top 50% of related products or not, but it is difficult to be more specific than that. Due to the strong impact that influence plays, this evidence emphasizes the need for marketers. They have a significant opportunity to show their products in the best light, with the most famous people, or being in the media most often. Such constant exposure is a way of gaining more product followers. Marketers can often make the difference between an average product and a popular product. However, since popularity is primarily constructed as a general consensus of a group's attitude towards something, word-of-mouth is a more effective way to attract new attention. Websites and blogs start by recommendations from one friend to another, as they move through social networking services. Eventually, when the fad is large enough, the media catches on to the craze. This spreading by word-of-mouth is the social information cascade that allows something to grow in usage and attention throughout a social group until everyone is telling everyone else about it, at which point it is deemed popular.

Individuals also rely on what others say when they know that the information they are given could be completely incorrect. This is known as groupthink. Relying on others to influence one's own decisions is a very powerful social influence, but can have negative impacts.

=== Zipf's law ===
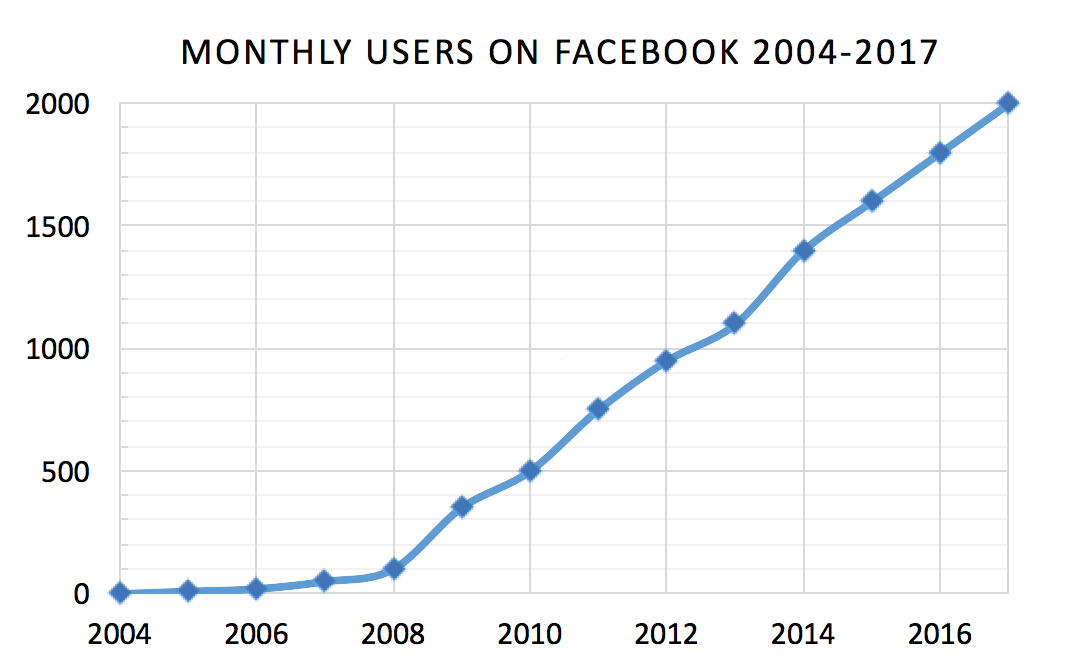
The popularity of Facebook over time illustrating Zipf's law

The popularity of many different things can be described by Zipf's powerlaw, which posits that there is a low frequency of very large quantities and a high frequency of low quantities. This illustrates popularity of many different objects.

For example, there are few very popular websites, but many websites have small followings. This is the result of interest; as many people use e-mail, it is common for sites like Yahoo to be accessed by large numbers of people; however, a small subset of people would be interested in a blog on a particular video game. In this situation, only Yahoo would be deemed a popular site by the public. This can additionally be seen in social networking services such as Facebook. The average number of friends on Facebook is 130, while very few people have large social networks. However, some individuals have more than 5,000 friends. This reflects that very few people can be extremely well-connected, but many people are somewhat connected. The number of friends a person has, has been a way to determine how popular an individual is, so the small number of people who have a high number of friends on social networking services, like Facebook, illustrates how only a few people are deemed popular.

Popular people may not be those who are best liked interpersonally by their peers, but they do receive most of the positive behavior from coworkers when compared to nonpopular workers. This is a result of the differences between sociometric and perceived popularity. When asked who is most popular, employees typically respond based on perceived popularity; however, they really prefer the social interactions with those who are more sociometrically popular. For each individual to ensure that they are consistent with the group's popularity consensus, those who are high in perceived popularity are treated with the same positive behaviors as those who are more interpersonally, but privately, liked by specific individuals. Well-liked workers are most likely to get salary increases and promotions, while disliked (unpopular) workers are the first to get their salary cut back or laid off during recessions.

During interactions with others in the work environment, more popular individuals receive more organizational citizenship behavior (helping and courteousness from others) and less counter productive work behavior (rude reactions and withheld information) than those who are considered less popular in the workplace. Coworkers agree with each other on who is and who is not popular and, as a group, treat popular coworkers more favorably. While popularity has proven to be a big determiner of getting more positive feedback and interactions from coworkers, such a quality matters less in organizations where workloads and interdependence is high, such as the medical field.

In many instances, physical appearance has been used as one indicator of popularity. Attractiveness plays a large role in the workplace and physical appearance influences hiring, whether or not the job might benefit from it. For example, some jobs, such as salesperson, benefit from attractiveness when it comes down to the bottom line, but there have been many studies which have shown that, in general, attractiveness is not at all a valid predictor of on-the-job performance. Many individuals have previously thought this was only a phenomenon in the more individualistic cultures of the Western world, but research has shown that attractiveness also plays a role in hiring in collectivist cultures as well. Because of the prevalence of this problem during the hiring process in all cultures, researchers have recommended training a group to ignore such influencers, just like legislation has worked to control for differences in sex, race, and disabilities.

== See also ==
- Peer group
- School bullying
- Self-esteem
- Social influence
- Social status
