= Crowds (adolescence) =

Social concept

Crowds are large groups of adolescents defined by their shared image and reputation. Crowd membership is externally imposed and not a direct consequence of interaction with other members of the crowd.

== Definition ==
Crowds are large groups of adolescents socially connected by a shared image and reputation, especially within the setting of a single school. It is possible for a single person to belong to more than one crowd if their image matches the crowds’ criteria. Because membership in a crowd depends on peers' perceptions, crowds in any given peer group will correspond to the local preconceived "types" of adolescents. Specific stereotypes vary from place to place, but many remain consistent, based on peer status, socioeconomic status, residential area, activities, social characteristics, or a combination of attributes (jocks, nerds, populars, and druggies are among the most commonly observed). Crowds are very different from cliques: while cliques are relatively small, close-knit groups based on frequent interaction and collectively determined membership, members of a crowd may not even know each other. Crowd membership reflects external assessments and expectations, providing a social context for identity exploration and self-definition as adolescents internalize or reject their crowd identities.

Because crowd membership is initially outwardly imposed, it is possible for an adolescent's peers to classify them as belonging to a crowd they may not consider themselves part of. Members of some crowds are more aware of and comfortable with their crowd designation than others; members of stigmatized or low-status groups, in particular, may resist or deny their undesirable categorization. Usually, however, adolescents embrace their crowd affiliation, using it to define themselves and advertise where they fit in their peer group's social structure.

== Crowds and identity development ==
Crowds serve an essential purpose in adolescent identity development, shaping individual values, behavior, and personal and peer expectations. "[One's group] is often tantamount to one's own provisional identity;" the individual defines herself by the crowd she sees herself fitting into. Different crowds expose the individual to different norms. These norms encourage adolescents to interact with some people while avoiding others and reward certain behaviors while discouraging others, a process of normative social influence. For example, a member of a "preppy" crowd might be rewarded for dressing in a fashion for which a member of an "emo" crowd would be teased, and vice versa.

Crowd effects on norms of interaction:

- Norms affect how the individual interacts with others. Members of high-status (preppie, popular) groups often interact with many people, but most of these relationships are superficial and instrumental; interpersonal connections are used to establish and maintain social status. By contrast, members of lower-caste groups (e.g., dorks, druggies) generally have fewer friends, mostly from within the crowd; however, these relationships are typically marked by greater loyalty, stability, and honesty.
- Norms affect who the individual interacts with. Crowds steer the individual toward certain people, attitudes, and behaviors. There are also effects of peer perception and expectations when individuals attempt to interact across crowds: one may be interested in a cross-crowd friendship, but whether or not the target reciprocates depends on their crowd's norms as well. The adolescent's social options for friendship and romance are limited by her own crowd and by other crowds.

Often crowds reinforce the behaviors that originally caused an individual to be labeled part of that crowd, which can positively or negatively influence the individual (toward academic achievement or drug use, for example). These pressures are often linked to the stereotypes members of crowds hold about themselves and members of other crowds: unity by denigration of the outgroup (see social identity theory).

== Racial crowds and sub-crowds ==
Adolescents' perception of crowd differences may depend on how closely related the adolescent observer is to a particular crowd. The basic, recurring crowd divisions (jocks, geeks, partiers) have been most often studied in predominantly white high schools, but they also exist for minority students. In multiracial schools, students seem to divide along ethnic lines first, then into these archetypical crowds within their own ethnicity. However, one ethnic group may not notice the further divisions in other ethnic groups after the first, race-based split. For instance, black students see themselves as divided into jocks, geeks, emos, stoners, popular kids, and so on, but white students may see them as just one crowd defined solely by ethnicity, "the black kids." Sometimes crowd membership transcends race, however, and adolescents are classified as "jocks" or "geeks" regardless of race. This seems to vary and depend heavily on the context of the individual school.

== Stereotypes, stigma, and cross-crowd friendships ==
While crowds are structured around prototypical caricatures of their members, real adolescents rarely match these extremes. Furthermore, not all adolescents agree on the characteristics typical of a stereotype. In other words, regular manifestation of just a few central characteristics of a crowd is a sufficient basis for classification as a member of that crowd. Thus, not all "jocks" neglect their schoolwork, though that is part of the typical jock stereotype, and a person interested in fashion could still be considered a "geek."

Often a crowd is stigmatized by one or more other crowds. This can affect adolescents' willingness to associate with members of that crowd, or even other crowds similar to it. For example, people may avoid being seen as a "brain," a middle-status crowd, because of the similarity between brains and "nerds," a lower-status crowd.

Shared interests form the basis of many friendships, so often adolescents are drawn to members of their own crowds, especially if their crowd is defined by activities rather than more superficial characteristics such as race or socioeconomic status. However, interests can be shared across crowd divisions. Accordingly, while an adolescent's closest friends are almost always part of the same clique (i.e., they interact frequently within the same small friend group), they are not always part of the same crowd, especially if multiple crowds have similar lifestyles.

== Crowd-hopping ==
Further emphasizing the flexible nature of crowd membership, some adolescents are not stably linked to one specific crowd—some individuals are associated with multiple crowds, while others are not stably linked to any crowds and "float" among several. These appear more closely attached to individuals outside the peer group (family, dropout friends, friends from a non-school organization, etc.). Others may consciously work to change crowd affiliations to express different interests or achieve a change in social status. The crowd with which an adolescent desires to be identified is far less stable than the personal attributes by which the adolescent is likely to be categorized by peers. Accordingly, adolescents who change crowd membership (a process known as "crowd-hopping") tend to have lower self-esteem, perhaps because they have not yet found an environment and peer group that supports them. It is likely that they continue changing crowd membership until they find a fulfilling niche.

== The rise of crowds ==
Crowds first emerge in middle or junior high school, when children transition from stable, self-contained classroom peer groups into larger schools, where they interact with a more varied body of peers with less adult guidance. Crowds emerge to group students by caricature and structure interactions between students of each type. Early crowds are often based on social status, especially among girls, with a small group of well-known children being "popular" and the rest "unpopular." To maintain their own status, popular girls will avoid the overtures of less-popular children, which actually makes them disliked. Many children stop attempting to gain entry into the popular crowd and make friends with other children instead, giving rise to new crowds.

The stereotypes on which crowd definitions are based change over time as adolescents shift from grouping people by abstract characteristics rather than activities ("geeks" rather than "the kids who read a lot"). With age, adolescents become more conscious of crowd divisions and the social hierarchy. Distinctions between crowds also become more nuanced, developing from simple popular/unpopular dichotomies to less hierarchical structures in which there are more than two levels of social acceptability, often with several crowds at each level. As seen in cross-crowd friendships, some crowds interact with each other more readily than others. This transition to a more fluid social structure allows adolescents to change their status over time by changing crowds, remaining in a crowd that undergoes a change in status, or gaining the confidence and perspective to reject the assumptions of the social hierarchy. Willingness to do so reflects a growing sense of personal identity distinct from crowd membership.

== The decline of crowds ==
Adolescents’ attitudes toward crowds change over time—while ninth-graders are willing to discriminate against members of other crowds, twelfth-graders are less likely to do so. Adolescents also develop more multifaceted self-concepts and reject crowd labels as simplistic attempts to describe an entire personality. Across the high school years, crowd significance as a basis for affiliation wanes, as does the influence of crowds on an individual's behavior. In fact, some studies indicate that the importance of crowds peaks at age 12 or 13. By the end of high school, adolescents often feel constrained by impersonal, crowd-derived identities. This, combined with the splintering off of romantic couples from the rest of the crowd, may account for the decline of crowd significance over time.
