= Clique =

Group of individuals who interact preferentially with one another

A clique (AusE, CanE, UK: /ˈkliːk/ or US: /ˈklɪk/; French: [klik]), in the social sciences, is a group of individuals who interact with one another and share similar interests rather than include others. Interacting with cliques is part of normative social development regardless of gender, ethnicity, or popularity. Although cliques are most commonly studied during adolescence and middle childhood development, they exist in all age groups. They are often bound together by shared social characteristics such as ethnicity and socioeconomic status. Examples of common or stereotypical adolescent cliques include athletes, nerds, and "outsiders".

Typically, people in a clique will not have a completely open friend group and can, therefore, "ban" members if they do something considered unacceptable, such as talking to someone disliked. Some cliques tend to isolate themselves as a group and view themselves as superior to others, which can be demonstrated through bullying and other antisocial behaviors.

== Terminology ==
Within the concepts of sociology, cliques are a formation of two or more individuals who share bonding characteristics that allow for them to identify with one another to form a social network. Those within the group communicate and associate with one another more than those outside of the group. The formation of cliques can be identified within different social environments throughout the course of their lives. One person may be part of multiple cliques, each forming and functioning independently from one another. Cliques are relevant in society due to the social influence or peer pressure that results from the interactions with individuals who share a common characteristic. The outcomes associated with clique formations may be endless, with varying degrees of influence. For example, a formal clique, such as a professional organization, would have a different kind of influence compared to a social clique consisting of close friends.

== Social isolation ==
In their article "Social Isolation In America", Paolo Parigi and Warner Henson II define social isolation as "the degree of apartness of an entity; [which] may have structural or subjective interpretations." Social isolation may occur when cliques set themselves apart from other groups.

A clique can also involve a high degree of social commitment to a specific group. A stronger level of commitment results in an individual having a reduced amount of interaction with other social groups. Cliquish behavior often involves the adoption of particular activities, vernacular, preferences, and mannerisms by those within the clique. This reinforces the perception of the clique as an exclusive ‘in group’, set apart from others who are deemed outsiders. Individuals can also experience social isolation within their own clique if their values and/or behavior begin to differ from the rest of the group.

== Members ==
Different factors affect the way cliques are established and who is included within their membership. In some cases, people are subconsciously placed in a clique by association. For example, joining a basketball team usually causes others to perceive that person as an "athlete" automatically. Many people may gravitate toward a clique subconsciously through how they are perceived or whom they may be associated with.

Sharing similar interests is the most common way cliques are formed. As people interact with each other doing the simple things they enjoy doing, they may find themselves drifting towards or becoming attracted to others who share the same passion. This usually causes one to gain confidence by being surrounded by people who share similar interests, and it may cause an individual to feel more socially accepted.

Ethnicity usually plays a role according to the setting or time frame. In today's society, race still is prevalent, and therefore, cliques solely based on race have been formed.

Members of cliques often create their own distinct dress code and uniquely communicate with one another. As a result, this makes a clique unique and reassures each member that they belong to that specific group. As these cliques come together, it isn't hard to distinguish one from the other. For example, Deadheads, the followers of the band The Grateful Dead, identify one another with various forms of tie-dyed clothing.

Interactions among members of a clique can also lead to organized social events, such as parties, significant dates, or private meetings. Clique members have a strong commitment to their respective groups. In regards to this, being present at social events is seen as mandatory. Considering this, it shows the firmness of cliques and how people ultimately conform to these specific groups.

Tina Abbott in her book "Social and Personality Development" describes how these members conform to their specific group. "Conformity to peer groups is a prerequisite to achieving independence and autonomy as an adult... As the young person struggles to become independent from their parents, they use the security provided by the peer group and the self-confidence that comes with it, to take the final step towards independence".

== Homophily ==
Homophily is how people tend to link up with others because they share similar characteristics. The existence of homophily is also very prevalent in today's society. This concept can be seen as a possible main cause of clique formation.

On the subject of homophily, people come together and link up for many different reasons. The most typical reason is people who are close in a location easily bond with each other. Also, people who meet through the family, workplace, or any activity that places people in contact with others often form personal relationships.

In some cases, the impact of homophily can be seen when people in cliques get married.

== Network formation ==
This involves meeting new people to form relationships and work together to gain better opportunities. Some people find that being associated with a clique is a way to find or gain a better chance at success. For example, many join a sorority or fraternity to gain an advantage at getting a job because they may be hired by someone affiliated. Cliques go hand in hand in the way people network and are especially prevalent for those looking for jobs.

== Organization ==
Every clique has some form of organization that makes up the network of social interaction. Informal clique networks are groups that do not have a legitimate organizational structure in which they can be established and dissolved in a shorter time period. An informal clique may consist of a person's friend group or co-workers while also identifying other more informal groups, such as criminal gangs. On the other hand, a formal clique is a group with a socially accepted organization that is hierarchical in structure. A formal clique is composed of members who have identifiable roles and interactions with one another and is found in numerous professional organizations, businesses, and even family structure. Culture is a very influential factor in the organization of clique structures because the boundaries established through differences in cultural aspects are persistent, even when the membership varies from time to time. For example, the differences in language, beliefs, traditions, etc. have always created a distinct separation or boundary between groups of people even though the group members are constantly changing.

== Development ==
The formation and deformation of clique structures do not end with adolescence, even though the number of interactions with clique groups decreases, and the type of groups may change. As individuals become adults, their social interpretations alter, and their cliques originate from their immediate environment, rather than from common social characteristics. A clique should not be confused with a crowd because the smaller size and specific boundaries of a group is what causes the group formation to be considered a clique. A clique can develop in several different ways and within environments that consist of individuals who interact regularly. The structural cohesion of the clique is the constant face-to-face interaction between members that can either create or dissolve the group, depending upon the level of interaction. If face-to-face interaction is regularly established, then cohesion between individuals will form. However, if the face-to-face interaction depreciates, then the cohesive social bond between said individuals will eventually dissolve.

== Social impact ==
A clique may inhibit external social influence by impacting the emotions, opinions, or behaviors of group members. There are many ways in which the perception of information between members in a clique can influence other members on a greater level than if they had received the same information from a different source. For example, receiving information from a close friend or family member is interpreted and responded to differently from receiving the same information from someone who is not within the clique structure. The satisfaction, interaction, and closeness of an individual's clique groups develop and change throughout the years. Yet, there is always a constant morphing of both the individual and the group as time goes on.

== See also ==
- Adolescent clique
- Cabal
- Clique in communication groups from Dunbar's number
- In-group and out-group
