= Sociometric status =

Concept in sociology

Sociometric status is a measurement that reflects the degree to which someone is liked or disliked by their peers as a group. While there are some studies that have looked at sociometric status among adults, the measure is primarily used with children and adolescents to make inferences about peer relations and social competence.

== Developmental psychology ==
In developmental psychology, this system has been used to examine children's status in peer groups, its stability over time, the characteristics that determine it, and the long-term implications of one's popularity or rejection by peers.

== The methodology ==
Generally, sociometric status is assessed through asking peers to rate an individual's status in the peer group. Two of the most widely used methods that are used for this are peer nomination and peer ratings. The peer ratings method asks the participants to assess, in numerical terms, how much they like the other peers in the group. The sociometric status is then calculated by taking an average of the ratings. The peer nomination technique, on the other hand, asks children to choose who they like and dislike most from the group. Then, the liked-most and liked-least ratings are interpreted to categorize children into sociometric variables. At first, researchers used only 2 categories: accepted and rejected children. However, Coie, Dodge and Coppotelli (1982) argued that such grouping doesn't capture the true complexity of sociometric status, as it fails to distinguish between two low-status groups – actively rejected children and socially neglected ones. They proposed that children be classified into 5 groups:

- Popular children: Children are designated as popular if they receive many positive nominations.
- Rejected children: Children are designated as rejected if they receive many negative nominations and few positive nominations.
- Neglected children: Children are designated as neglected if they receive few positive or negative nominations. These children are not especially liked or disliked by peers, and tend to go unnoticed.
- Average children: Children are designated as average if they receive an average number of both positive and negative nominations.
- Controversial children: Children are designated as controversial if they receive many positive and many negative nominations. They are said to be liked by quite a few children, but also disliked by quite a few.

While peer ratings/nominations are the most commonly used method to assess sociometric status, they are often accompanied by teacher assessment, observations, or even self-assessment.

== Descriptions of specific sociometric groups ==
=== Popular children ===
Popular children tend to display higher social skills than other groups, and they are often described as cooperators or leaders. They can easily think of effective ways to start interactions or resolve conflicts with their peers, and they can recognise other people's emotions better. Most studies find that they display less aggressive and disruptive behaviours than rejected or controversial children, but it has been suggested that this isn't an inherent characteristic. Some popular children have aggressive or antisocial traits but are still liked or even looked up to.

=== Rejected children ===
Rejected children score worse on social competence than popular children. While they approach their peers just as much, or even more than popular ones, their initiations of contact are usually turned down. Most studies show that they display more aggressive behaviours than other groups of children, and they tend to have lower communicative skills. They also perform worse academically, struggling to stay focused on their assigned academic tasks. Lastly, rejected children experience higher rates of anxiety and depression than other sociometric groups.

=== Neglected children ===
Neglected children are generally the least prosocial group, frequently described as shy. Because of this, they aren't particularly liked nor disliked by their peers. However, this doesn't translate into them being more lonely than average children. Furthermore, despite their low social skills, they manage to outperform others in academic achievements, having higher levels of motivation and independence.

=== Controversial children ===
Controversial children, combining characteristics of popular and rejected profiles, are very liked by some peers, but actively disliked by others. They are visible, active, assertive, and extremely sociable, often perceived as leaders. At the same time, they are frequently described as aggressive and disruptive (mostly boys) or arrogant (mostly girls). The evidence behind their academic performance is inconclusive – some studies describe them as “slow at school”, while others assess their performance as good.

== Stability of sociometric status ==
Whether the sociometric status stays stable across time is important because it indicates the stability of actual peer relations and liking/disliking mechanisms in a group.

As a recent meta-analysis study found, the stability of sociometric status depends on age, gender, the interval between measuring times, and the publication year of the study.

The older the children, the more solidified the structure in their peer group, and so, the more stable their sociometric ratings. Bukowski and Newcomb (1985) found that sociometric status remained stable in school-aged children even when there were changes in the size and composition of the group due to transitioning from elementary to middle school. Preschool children, on the other hand, tend to be more unreliable in their results, especially when using the peer nominations technique. However, when the rating-scale measure is used, the stability improves; though, this may only be a result of a statistical artifact.

When it comes to gender, a larger proportion of boys in the group is correlated with lower stability, but the exact mechanism for this association is unknown.

Stability also decreases as the interval between measuring points increases.

Lastly, as the publication year increases, the children's liking preferences become less stable, while their disliking patterns become more stable, at least in the US. A possible explanation of this phenomenon is that over the recent decades, there has been an increase in anxiety levels of American children. It may be that as the children become more anxious over time, they start focusing on who they dislike more than who they like.

== Long-term implications ==
Whether the emotional or behavioural consequences of a child's sociometric status follow the child into adolescence or even adulthood is a question of great importance.

As it turns out, the children's aggressive tendencies can translate into their later life, as both rejected and controversial boys (the most aggressive groups) have a higher chance of committing violent or non-violent offendings in adolescence. Notably, this does not seem to be the pattern for aggressive girls.

Furthermore, the symptoms of anxiety and depression that rejected children often face can be prolonged into the future, as it has been found that socially isolated children have a greater risk of developing mental health problems in adolescence or adulthood. It is argued that it is not only that peer rejection plays a role in eliciting depression, but depressive symptoms can also lead to rejection.

It seems, therefore, that social acceptance plays a vital role in one's social and emotional adaptation. Low social status children may lack the opportunity to develop their social skills, which leads to them being even more isolated in future interactions, and this positive feedback loop is difficult to break. Hence, social skills training programs are often implemented to help children to adapt to their social environments and prevent these future consequences. The sociometric status is an especially useful measure there, as it is used to both identify the children in need, and assess the effectiveness of those programs.

== Positive psychology ==
While socioeconomic measures of status do not correspond to greater happiness, measures of sociometric status (status compared to people encountered face-to-face on a daily basis) do correlate to increased subjective well-being, above and beyond the effects of extroversion and other factors.

== See also ==
- Sociometry
